= Viscount Newark =

Viscountcy in the Peerage of Great Britain

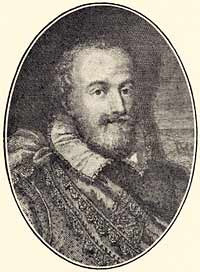
Robert Pierrepont, 1st Viscount Newark (first creation).

Viscount Newark is a title that has been created twice in British history, each time with the subsidiary title of Baron Pierrepont.

The first creation was on 29 June 1627 in the Peerage of England for Sir Robert Pierrepont. This creation was to become the courtesy title for the heir apparent to the Earldom of Kingston-upon-Hull, with this title being bestowed on the first Viscount Newark in 1628. The fifth Earl was created Duke of Kingston-upon-Hull in 1715 in the Peerage of Great Britain, with the Dukedom becoming extinct on the death of the second Duke in 1773.

The second creation was on 23 July 1796 in the Peerage of Great Britain for Charles Pierrepont, with the territorial designation of Newark on Trent. The first Viscount of this creation was the grandson of the first Duke of Kingston-upon-Hull, and was named as the heir of the second Duke in his will. The first Viscount succeeded to the Duke's estates (though not his titles) on the death of the Duke's wife in 1788. He was further created Earl Manvers in the Peerage of the United Kingdom in 1806. These titles became extinct upon the death of the sixth Earl in 1955.

== Viscounts Newark, first creation (1627) ==
- Robert Pierrepont, 1st Viscount Newark (1584–1643) (created Earl of Kingston-upon-Hull in 1628)
- For further succession, see Earl of Kingston-upon-Hull

== Viscounts Newark, of Newark on Trent, second creation (1796) ==
- Charles Pierrepont, 1st Viscount Newark (1737–1816) (created Earl Manvers in 1806)
- For further succession, see Earl Manvers

== Family tree ==
Family tree of the Dukes of Kingston-upon-Hull, and related titles

Henry Pierrepont; 1546–1615
Viscount Newark and Baron Pierrepont (1st creation), 1627; Earl of Kingston-upon-Hull, 1628
Robert Pierrepont; 1584–1643; 1st Earl of Kingston-upon-Hull, Viscount Newark, and Baron Pierrepont
Marquess of Dorchester (1st creation), 1647
Henry Pierrepont; 1606–1680; 1st Marquess of Dorchester, 2nd Earl of Kingston-upon-Hull, Viscount Newark, and Baron Pierrepont	William Pierrepont c. 1607–1678
Marquessate of Dorchester (1st creation) extinct, 1680
Baron Pierrepont (2nd creation), of Ardglass (Ireland), 1702; Baron Pierrepont (3rd creation), of Hanslape (Great Britain), 1714
Robert Pierrepont d. 1666	Gervase Pierrepont; 1649–1715; Baron Pierrepont
Baronies extinct, 1715
Marquess of Dorchester (2nd creation), 1706, Duke of Kingston-upon-Hull, 1715
Robert Pierrepont c. 1660–1682; 3rd Earl of Kingston-upon-Hull, Viscount Newark, and Baron Pierrepont	William Pierrepont c. 1662–1690; 4th Earl of Kingston-upon-Hull, Viscount Newark, and Baron Pierrepont	Evelyn Pierrepont; 1665–1726; 1st Duke of Kingston-upon-Hull and Marquess of Dorchester, 5th Earl of Kingston-upon-Hull, Viscount Newark, and Baron Pierrepont
William Pierrepont; 1692–1713 styled Earl of Kingston-upon-Hull
Frances Pierrepont; 1711–1795	Evelyn Pierrepont; 1711–1773; 2nd Duke of Kingston-upon-Hull and Marquess of Dorchester, 6th Earl of Kingston-upon-Hull, Viscount Newark, and Baron Pierrepont
All titles extinct, 1773
Viscount Newark (2nd creation), of Newark on Trent and Baron Pierrepont (4th creation), of Holme Pierrepont in the County of Nottingham (Great Britain), 1796; Earl Manvers (United Kingdom), 1806
Charles (Medows) Pierrepont; 1737–1816; 1st Earl Manvers, Viscount Newark, and Baron Pierrepont
Evelyn Henry Fitzpatrick Pierrepont; 1775–1801	Charles Herbert Pierrepont; 1778–1860; 2nd Earl Manvers, Viscount Newark, and Baron Pierrepont
Charles Evelyn Pierrepont; 1805–1850 styled Viscount Newark	Sydney William Herbert Pierrepont; 1826–1900; 3rd Earl Manvers, Viscount Newark, and Baron Pierrepont
Charles William Sydney Pierrepont; 1854–1926; 4th Earl Manvers, Viscount Newark, and Baron Pierrepont	Evelyn Henry Pierrepont; 1856–1926
Evelyn Robert Pierrepont; 1888–1940; 5th Earl Manvers, Viscount Newark, and Baron Pierrepont	Gervas Evelyn Pierrepont; 1881–1955; 6th Earl Manvers, Viscount Newark, and Baron Pierrepont
All titles extinct, 1955
