= Pierrepont =

Pierrepont is the name or part of the name of several communes in northern France:

- Pierrepont, Aisne, in the Aisne département
- Pierrepont, Calvados, in the Calvados département
- Pierrepont, Meurthe-et-Moselle, in the Meurthe-et-Moselle département
- Pierrepont-sur-Avre, in the Somme département
- Pierrepont-sur-l'Arentèle, in the Vosges département
- Bucy-lès-Pierrepont, Aisne département
- Missy-lès-Pierrepont, commune française de l'Aisne
- Goudelancourt-lès-Pierrepont, commune française de l'Aisne
- Saint-Nicolas-de-Pierrepont, commune française de la Manche département
- Saint-Sauveur-de-Pierrepont, commune française de la Manche département

== Other places ==
- Pierrepont, New York - town and Hamlet in New York
- Holme Pierrepont - village in Nottinghamshire, UK

== People ==
- Henry Pierrepont (politician) (1546–1615) - Landowner and MP
- Robert Pierrepont, 1st Earl of Kingston-upon-Hull (1584–1643) - Royalist soldier
- Henry Pierrepont, 2nd Earl of Kingston-upon-Hull (1607–1680) - MP and Privy Counsellor
- Francis Pierrepont (Parliamentarian) (died 1659) - Parliamentarian soldier and MP
- Robert Pierrepont, 3rd Earl of Kingston-upon-Hull (1660–1682) -
- William Pierrepont, 4th Earl of Kingston-upon-Hull (1662–1690) -
- Evelyn Pierrepont, 1st Duke of Kingston-upon-Hull (c.1655–1726) - MP
- Evelyn Pierrepont, 2nd Duke of Kingston-upon-Hull (1711–1773) -
- Charles Pierrepont, 1st Earl Manvers (1737–1816) - Naval Officer
- Charles Herbert Pierrepont, 2nd Earl Manvers (1778–1860)
- Sydney William Herbert Pierrepont, 3rd Earl Manvers (1825–1900)
- Charles William Sydney Pierrepont, 4th Earl Manvers (1854–1926)
- Henry Pierrepont (diplomat) (1780–1851) - Envoy to the Court of Sweden.
- Hezekiah Pierrepont (1768–1838) - American businessman

== See also ==
- Pierrepoint (disambiguation)
