= Earl Manvers =

Extinct earldom in the Peerage of the United Kingdom

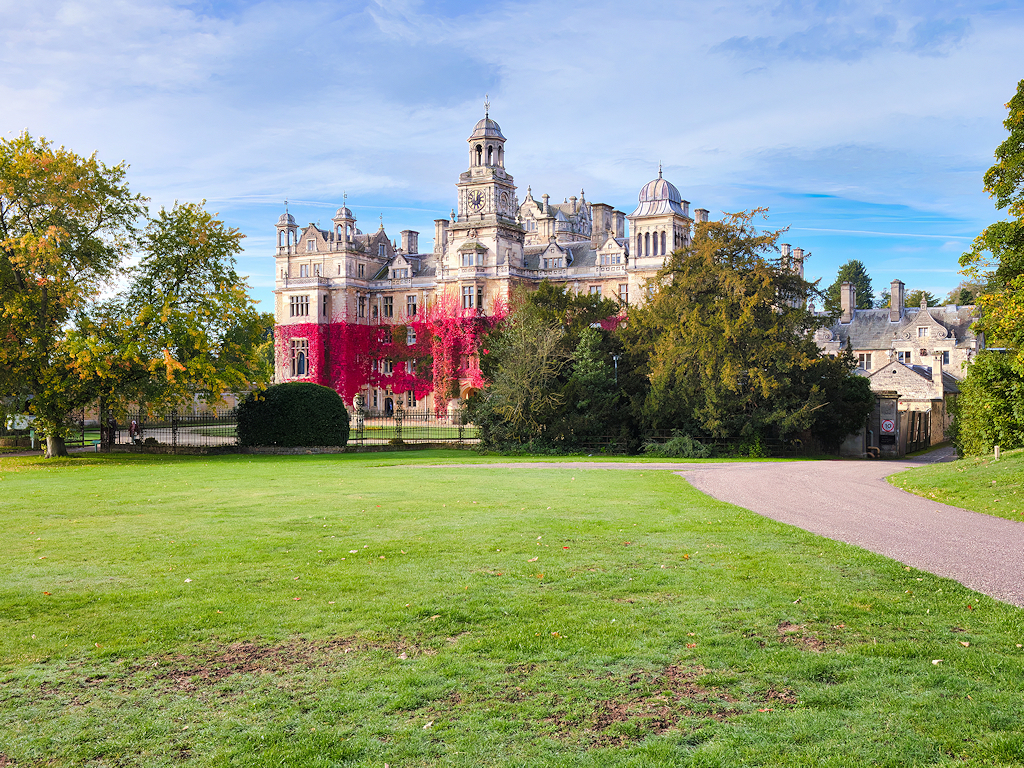
Thoresby Hall

Earl Manvers was a title in the Peerage of the United Kingdom. It was created in 1806 for Charles Medows Pierrepont, 1st Viscount Newark. He had already been created Baron Pierrepont, of Holme Pierrepont in the County of Nottingham, and Viscount Newark, of Newark-on-Trent in the County of Nottingham, in 1796. Both these titles were in the Peerage of Great Britain.

Born Charles Medows, he was the second son of Philip Meadows (1708-1781), Deputy Ranger of Richmond Park, by Lady Frances Pierrepont (1711-1795), daughter of William Pierrepont, Earl of Kingston (1692–1713), eldest son and heir apparent of Evelyn Pierrepont, 1st Duke of Kingston-upon-Hull. The name of the earldom derives from the Manvers family, from a marriage to an heiress of which family (Annora de Manvers) the family seat of Holme Pierrepont (formerly simply Holme) had passed into the Pierrepont family in the 13th century.

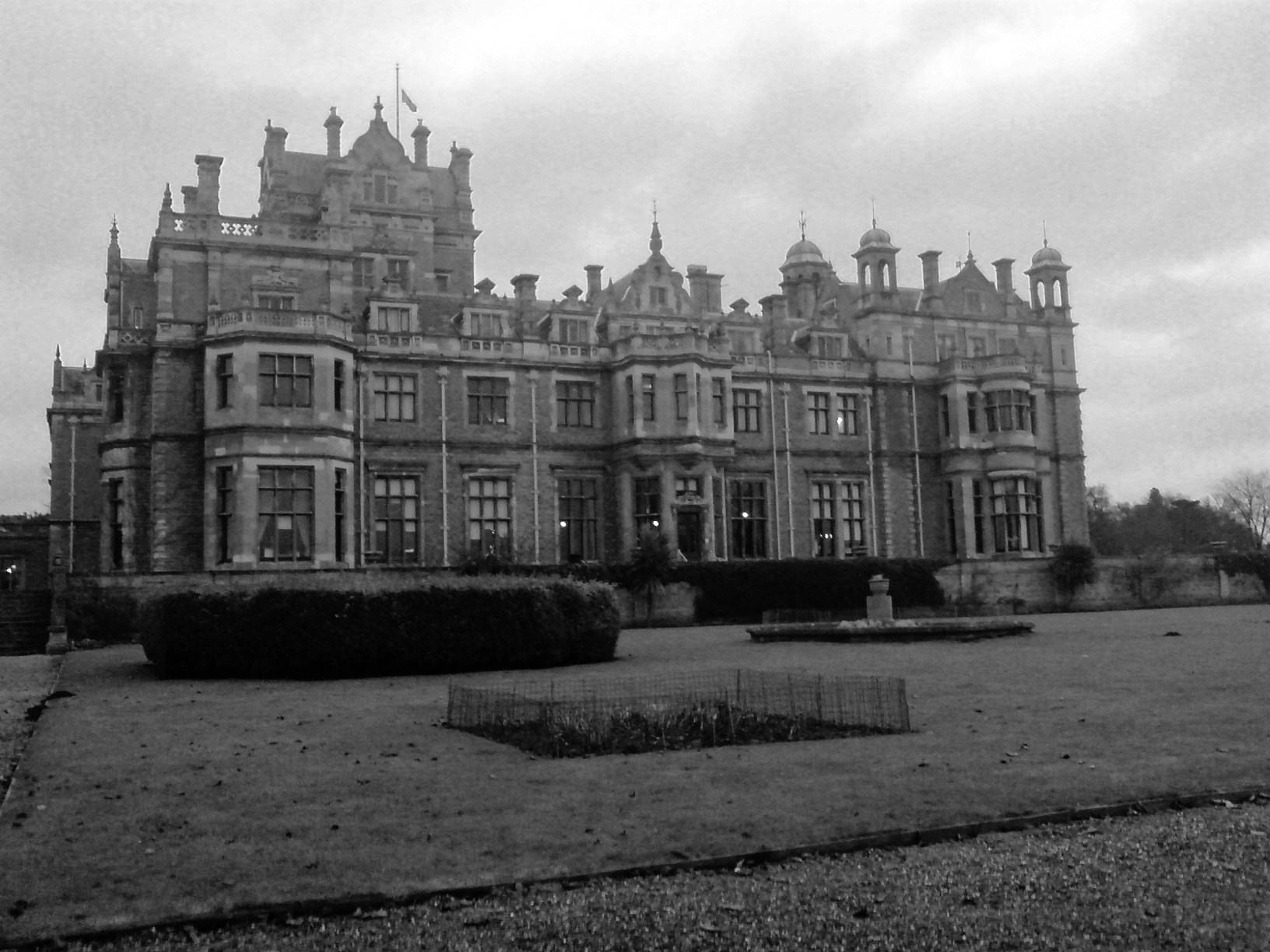
Thoresby Hall, seat of the Earls Manvers

In 1788 Charles Medows had succeeded to the Pierrepont estates on the death of the second Duke's wife, and assumed the same year by Royal sign manual the surname of Pierrepont in lieu of Medows. Manvers's eldest son Evelyn Pierrepont predeceased him and he was succeeded by his second son Charles, the second Earl. He was a naval commander and Member of Parliament. He was succeeded by his second and only surviving son, Sydney, the third Earl. He represented Nottinghamshire South in Parliament. He was succeeded by his eldest son, Charles, the fourth Earl. He sat as Conservative Member of Parliament for Newark, elected on four occasions. On his death the titles passed to his only son Evelyn, the fifth Earl. He suffered a mental breakdown at the age of 17 and never married.

The fifth Earl was succeeded by his cousin Gervas Pierrepont, the sixth Earl. He was the only son of the Hon Evelyn Henry Pierrepont (1856–1926), second son of the third Earl. The sixth Earl's only son died as a child and the Earldom and subsidiary titles became extinct on the Earl's death in 1955.

Other members of the family may also be mentioned. Edward Medows (died 1813), brother of the first Earl, was a captain in the Royal Navy. Sir William Medows, brother of the first Earl, was a General in the British Army. The Honourable Henry Pierrepont, third son of the first Earl, was a diplomat.

The ancestral seat of the Earls Manvers was Thoresby Hall, near Ollerton, Nottinghamshire. The hall itself, built in the 1860s by the third Earl to the designs of Anthony Salvin was the 3rd building on the site replacing a smaller Georgian house which in turn had replaced a large Baroque house designed by Talman which had burned down. It remained the home of the last Countess Manvers until her death aged 95 in 1984 and was subsequently sold by the family and is now a hotel and conference venue. The Thoresby wider agricultural and forestry estate remains with the descendants of the Pierreponts and they have built a new Country House elsewhere on the Estate.

A comprehensive school named after him Manvers Pierrepont Comprehensive, Carlton Road, Nottingham. The school site still exists but rationalisation transformed it to a College of Further Education.

== Arms ==
Arms of Pierrepont

The arms of the head of the Pierrepont family are blazoned Argent semée of cinquefoils gules, a lion rampant sable.

== Earls Manvers (1806) ==
- Charles Pierrepont, 1st Earl Manvers (1737–1816)
  - Evelyn Henry Frederick Pierrepont (1775–1801)
- Charles Herbert Pierrepont, 2nd Earl Manvers (1778–1860)
  - Charles Evelyn Pierrepont, Viscount Newark (1805–1850)
- Sydney William Herbert Pierrepont, 3rd Earl Manvers (1825–1900)
- Charles William Sydney Pierrepont, 4th Earl Manvers (1854–1926)
- Evelyn Robert Pierrepont, 5th Earl Manvers (25 July 1888 – 6 April 1940). Styled Viscount Newark from 1900 to 1926, he was the eldest son of Charles Pierrepont, 4th Earl Manvers. Educated at Eton, he suffered a mental breakdown at the age of 17 and was incapacitated for the remainder of his life. His estates were administered by a trust. He never married, and his cousin Gervas succeeded to the title on his death.
- Gervas Evelyn Pierrepont, 6th Earl Manvers (1881–1955)
  - Evelyn Louis Butterfield Pierrepont (1924–1928)

== Family tree ==
Family tree of the Dukes of Kingston-upon-Hull, and related titles

Henry Pierrepont; 1546–1615
Viscount Newark and Baron Pierrepont (1st creation), 1627; Earl of Kingston-upon-Hull, 1628
Robert Pierrepont; 1584–1643; 1st Earl of Kingston-upon-Hull, Viscount Newark, and Baron Pierrepont
Marquess of Dorchester (1st creation), 1647
Henry Pierrepont; 1606–1680; 1st Marquess of Dorchester, 2nd Earl of Kingston-upon-Hull, Viscount Newark, and Baron Pierrepont	William Pierrepont c. 1607–1678
Marquessate of Dorchester (1st creation) extinct, 1680
Baron Pierrepont (2nd creation), of Ardglass (Ireland), 1702; Baron Pierrepont (3rd creation), of Hanslape (Great Britain), 1714
Robert Pierrepont d. 1666	Gervase Pierrepont; 1649–1715; Baron Pierrepont
Baronies extinct, 1715
Marquess of Dorchester (2nd creation), 1706, Duke of Kingston-upon-Hull, 1715
Robert Pierrepont c. 1660–1682; 3rd Earl of Kingston-upon-Hull, Viscount Newark, and Baron Pierrepont	William Pierrepont c. 1662–1690; 4th Earl of Kingston-upon-Hull, Viscount Newark, and Baron Pierrepont	Evelyn Pierrepont; 1665–1726; 1st Duke of Kingston-upon-Hull and Marquess of Dorchester, 5th Earl of Kingston-upon-Hull, Viscount Newark, and Baron Pierrepont
William Pierrepont; 1692–1713 styled Earl of Kingston-upon-Hull
Frances Pierrepont; 1711–1795	Evelyn Pierrepont; 1711–1773; 2nd Duke of Kingston-upon-Hull and Marquess of Dorchester, 6th Earl of Kingston-upon-Hull, Viscount Newark, and Baron Pierrepont
All titles extinct, 1773
Viscount Newark (2nd creation Great Britain) and Baron Pierrepont (4th creation), of Holme Pierrepont in the County of Nottingham (Great Britain), 1796; Earl Manvers (United Kingdom), 1806
Charles (Medows) Pierrepont; 1737–1816; 1st Earl Manvers, Viscount Newark, and Baron Pierrepont
Evelyn Henry Fitzpatrick Pierrepont; 1775–1801	Charles Herbert Pierrepont; 1778–1860; 2nd Earl Manvers, Viscount Newark, and Baron Pierrepont
Charles Evelyn Pierrepont; 1805–1850 styled Viscount Newark	Sydney William Herbert Pierrepont; 1826–1900; 3rd Earl Manvers, Viscount Newark, and Baron Pierrepont
Charles William Sydney Pierrepont; 1854–1926; 4th Earl Manvers, Viscount Newark, and Baron Pierrepont	Evelyn Henry Pierrepont; 1856–1926
Evelyn Robert Pierrepont; 1888–1940; 5th Earl Manvers, Viscount Newark, and Baron Pierrepont	Gervas Evelyn Pierrepont; 1881–1955; 6th Earl Manvers, Viscount Newark, and Baron Pierrepont
All titles extinct, 1955
