= Duke of Kingston-upon-Hull =

Dukedom in the Peerage of Great Britain

Dukedom of Kingston-upon-Hull
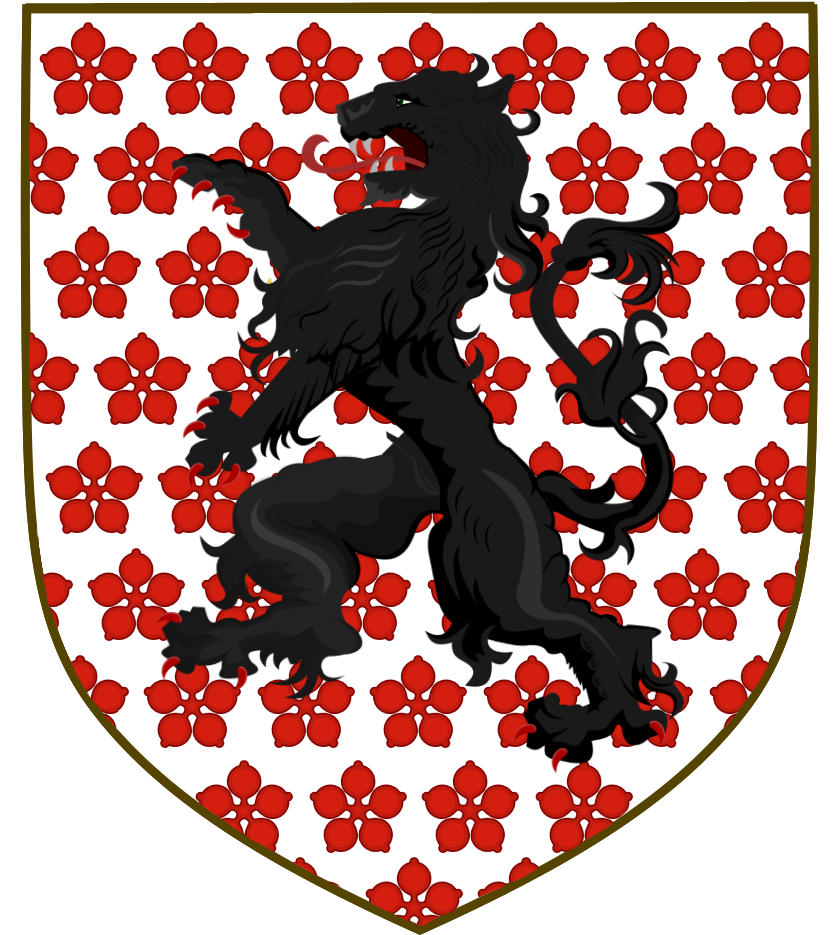
- Argent semée of cinquefoils gules, a lion rampant sable
- Creation date: 10 August 1715
- Created by: George I
- Peerage: Peerage of Great Britain
- First holder: Evelyn Pierrepont, 1st Marquess of Dorchester
- Last holder: Evelyn Pierrepont, 2nd Duke of Kingston-upon-Hull
- Remainder to: The first Duke's heirs male of the body lawfully begotten
- Subsidiary titles: Marquess of Dorchester (1706); Earl of Kingston-upon-Hull (1628); Viscount Newark (1627); Baron Pierrepont (1627)
- Status: Extinct
- Extinction date: 23 September 1773
- Seats: Holme Pierrepont Hall; Thoresby Hall

Duke of Kingston-upon-Hull was a title in the Peerage of Great Britain, with the title Earl of Kingston-upon-Hull being a title in the Peerage of England. The earldom was created on 25 July 1628 for Robert Pierrepont, 1st Viscount Newark. The dukedom was created on 10 August 1715 for his great-grandson, Evelyn Pierrepont, 1st Marquess of Dorchester, who had succeeded as the fifth Earl of Kingston-upon-Hull in 1690. The dukedom became extinct on the death of the second Duke in 1773. Unlike the city to which they refer, Kingston upon Hull, which is usually shortened to Hull, these titles are usually shortened to Duke (or Earl) of Kingston. (The titles were hyphenated but the city is now usually written without hyphens). They should not be confused with the separate Irish Earldom of Kingston (which refers to the town of Kingston in County Dublin).

== History ==
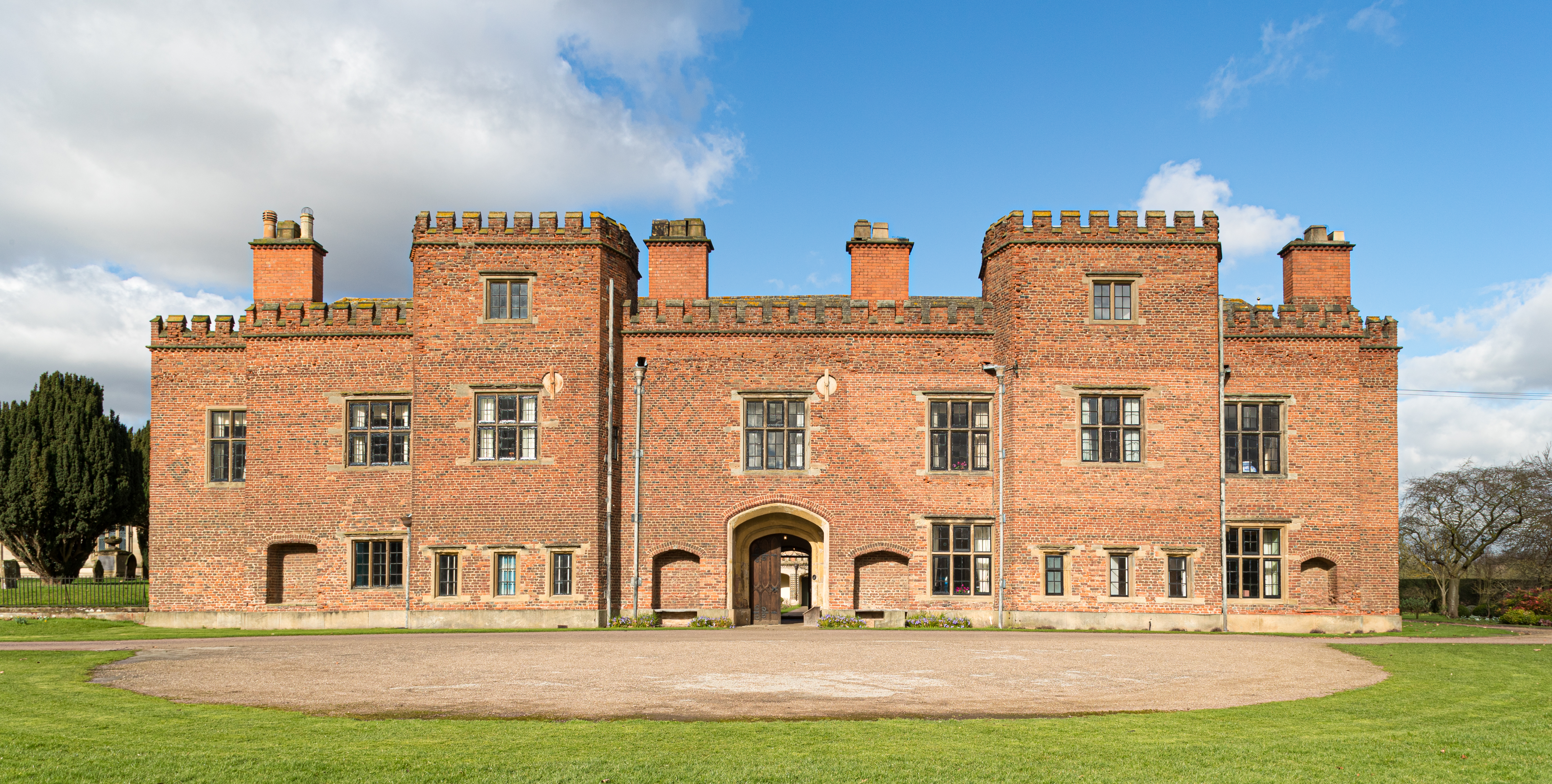
Holme Pierrepont Hall, the original seat of the Dukes of Kingston-upon-Hull

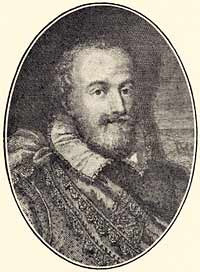
Robert Pierrepont, 1st Earl of Kingston-upon-Hull

Evelyn Pierrepont, 1st Duke of Kingston-upon-Hull

From the 13th century, the seat of the Pierrepont family had been Holme Pierrepont Hall, Nottinghamshire. This was to move during the sixteenth century to Thoresby Hall, also in Nottinghamshire. Several members of the family had served in the 15th and 16th centuries as High Sheriff of Nottinghamshire and Derbyshire. The direct forebear of the Dukes and Earls of Kingson-upon-Hull was Sir Henry Pierrepont who represented Nottinghamshire in Parliament. He had married Frances Cavendish, daughter and eldest child of Sir William Cavendish and Bess of Hardwick.

Sir Henry Pierrepont's son, Sir Robert Pierrepont, was created Viscount Newark and Baron Pierrepont in the Peerage of England on 29 June 1627. In 1628 he was further honoured when he was made Earl of Kingston-upon-Hull with a remainder to heirs general, also in the Peerage of England. Robert Pierrepont had married Gertrude Talbot in 1601. She was a granddaughter of George Talbot, 6th Earl of Shrewsbury, and through him, all their descendants are able to claim descent from Edward III, through Edward's younger son, Thomas of Woodstock.

The first Earl was succeeded by his son, Henry Pierrepont, who was himself created Marquess of Dorchester in 1645. He died without heirs in 1660, and this marquessate became extinct. The earldom and other titles devolved on his nephew, Robert, the third Earl, the eldest son of the Honourable William Pierrepont, second son of the first Earl. Robert died unmarried and was succeeded by his younger brother, William, the fourth Earl. William was in his turn succeeded by his younger brother, the aforementioned Evelyn, the fifth Earl. He was created Marquess of Dorchester in the Peerage of England in 1706, a revival of the title held by his uncle, and later created Duke of Kingston-upon-Hull in the Peerage of Great Britain in 1715, with these titles becoming extinct on the death of the first Duke's grandson, Evelyn, the second Duke, in 1773. On the death of the second Duke's wife, the estates of the Dukes of Kingston-upon-Hull passed to Charles Medows. He was a great-grandson of the first Duke through the female line. He changed his surname to Pierrepont, and was created Viscount Newark, and Baron Pierrepont, of Holme Pierrepont in 1796 and later created Earl Manvers in 1806. These titles became extinct on the death of the sixth Earl Manvers in 1955.

Several other members of the family have also gained distinction. The Honourable William Pierrepont, second son of the first Earl, was a politician. His third son Gervase Pierrepont was created Baron Pierrepont in 1701. Lady Mary Pierrepont, better known as Lady Mary Wortley Montagu, daughter of the first Duke, was a writer, and introduced smallpox inoculation to Western medicine after witnessing it during her travels and stay in the Ottoman Empire. Elizabeth Pierrepont, Duchess of Kingston-upon-Hull, wife of the second Duke, was a courtier.

== Earls of Kingston-upon-Hull (1628) ==
Other titles: Viscount Newark and Baron Pierrepont (1627)

- Robert Pierrepont, 1st Earl of Kingston-upon-Hull (1584–1643) was already Viscount Newark and Baron Pierrepont since 1627
- Henry Pierrepont, 2nd Earl of Kingston-upon-Hull (1607–1680) (created Marquess of Dorchester in 1645)

== Marquesses of Dorchester; First creation (1645) ==
Other titles: Earl of Kingston-upon-Hull (1628), Viscount Newark and Baron Pierrepont (1627)

- Henry Pierrepont, 1st Marquess of Dorchester (1607–1680), eldest son of the first Earl, died without surviving male issue, and his marquessate became extinct

== Earls of Kingston-upon-Hull (1628, Reverted) ==
Other titles: Viscount Newark and Baron Pierrepont (1627)

- Robert Pierrepont, 3rd Earl of Kingston-upon-Hull (c. 1660–1682), eldest son of Robert Pierrepont (grandson of the first Earl), died without issue
- William Pierrepont, 4th Earl of Kingston-upon-Hull (c. 1662–1690), second son of Robert Pierrepont, died without issue
- Evelyn Pierrepont, 5th Earl of Kingston-upon-Hull (1665–1726) (created Marquess of Dorchester in 1706 and Duke of Kingston-upon-Hull in 1715)

== Dukes of Kingston-upon-Hull (1715) ==
Other titles: Marquess of Dorchester (1706), Earl of Kingston-upon-Hull (1628), Viscount Newark and Baron Pierrepont (1627)

- Evelyn Pierrepont, 1st Duke of Kingston-upon-Hull (1665–1726), third and youngest son of Robert Pierrepont
  - William Pierrepont, Earl of Kingston-upon-Hull (1692–1713), only son of the first Duke, predeceased his father
- Evelyn Pierrepont, 2nd Duke of Kingston-upon-Hull (1711–1773), only son of William, Earl of Kingston. The second Duke died without issue and the dukedom became extinct.

== Arms ==
Coat of arms of Duke of Kingston-upon-Hull

Coronet
Coronet of a Duke
Crest
A Lion rampant Sable, between two Wings erect Argent.
Escutcheon
Argent, semée of Cinquefoils Gules, a Lion rampant Sable.
Supporters
On either side a Lion Sable, armed and langued Gules.
Motto
PIE REPONE TE (Dutifully restore you)

== Family tree ==
Pierrepont family tree including Dukes of Kingston-upon-Hull, and related titles

Henry Pierrepont; 1546–1615
Viscount Newark and Baron Pierrepont (1st creation), 1627; Earl of Kingston-upon-Hull, 1628
Robert Pierrepont; 1584–1643; 1st Earl of Kingston-upon-Hull, etc.
Marquess of Dorchester (1st creation), 1647
Henry Pierrepont; 1606–1680; 1st Marquess of Dorchester; 2nd Earl of Kingston-upon-Hull, etc.	William Pierrepont c. 1607–1678
Marquessate of Dorchester (1st creation) extinct, 1680
Baron Pierrepont (2nd creation), of Ardglass, 1702; Baron Pierrepont (3rd creation), of Hanslape, 1714
Robert Pierrepont d. 1666	Gervase Pierrepont; 1649–1715; Baron Pierrepont
Baronies extinct, 1715
Marquess of Dorchester (2nd creation), 1706, Duke of Kingston-upon-Hull, 1715
Robert Pierrepont c. 1660–1682; 3rd Earl of Kingston-upon-Hull, etc.	William Pierrepont c. 1662–1690; 4th Earl of Kingston-upon-Hull, etc.	Evelyn Pierrepont; 1665–1726; 1st Duke of Kingston-upon-Hull, etc., 5th Earl of Kingston-upon-Hull, etc.
William Pierrepont; 1692–1713 styled Earl of Kingston-upon-Hull
Philip Meadows; 1708–1781	Frances Pierrepont; 1711–1795	Evelyn Pierrepont; 1711–1773; 2nd Duke of Kingston-upon-Hull, etc., 6th Earl of Kingston-upon-Hull, etc.
All titles extinct, 1773
Viscount Newark (2nd creation), of Newark on Trent and Baron Pierrepont (4th creation), of Holme Pierrepont, 1796; Earl Manvers, 1806
Charles (Meadows) Pierrepont; 1737–1816; 1st Earl Manvers, etc.
Evelyn Henry Fitzpatrick Pierrepont; 1775–1801	Charles Herbert Pierrepont; 1778–1860; 2nd Earl Manvers, etc.
Charles Evelyn Pierrepont; 1805–1850 styled Viscount Newark	Sydney William Herbert Pierrepont; 1826–1900; 3rd Earl Manvers, etc.
Charles William Sydney Pierrepont; 1854–1926; 4th Earl Manvers, etc.	Evelyn Henry Pierrepont; 1856–1926
Evelyn Robert Pierrepont; 1888–1940; 5th Earl Manvers, etc.	Gervas Evelyn Pierrepont; 1881–1955; 6th Earl Manvers, etc.
All titles extinct, 1955

== See also ==
- Earl Manvers
- Viscount Newark
- Baron Pierrepont
