= Baron Pierrepont =

Barony in the Peerage of Great Britain

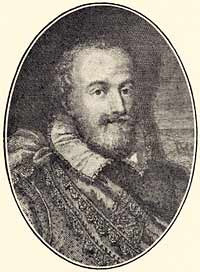
Robert Pierrepont, 1st Baron Pierrepont (first creation).

Baron Pierrepont is a title that has been created four times in British history. The first creation came in the Peerage of England on 29 June 1627 when Sir Robert Pierrepont was created Baron Pierrepont, also being created Viscount Newark at the same time. He was further created Earl of Kingston-upon-Hull in 1628. The fifth Earl was created Duke of Kingston-upon-Hull in 1715 in the Peerage of Great Britain, with the Dukedom becoming extinct on the death of the second Duke in 1773.

The second creation came in the Peerage of Ireland on 29 March 1702 when Gervase Pierrepont was created Baron Pierrepont, of Ardglass, County Down. On 19 October 1714 he was also made Baron Pierrepont, of Hanslope in the County of Buckingham, in the Peerage of Great Britain, being the third creation of the title, with this creation giving Gervase Pierrepont an automatic seat in the House of Lords. He was the third son of the Honourable William Pierrepont, second son of Robert Pierrepont, 1st Earl of Kingston-upon-Hull. The titles became extinct on his death on 22 May 1715.

The fourth creation came in the Peerage of Great Britain on 23 July 1796 when Charles Pierrepont was made Baron Pierrepont, of Holme Pierrepont in the County of Nottingham. He was made Viscount Newark, of Newark on Trent, at the same time. Born Charles Medows, he was the son of Philip Medows and Lady Frances, daughter of William Pierrepont, Earl of Kingston, eldest son and heir apparent of Evelyn Pierrepont, 1st Duke of Kingston-upon-Hull. In 1788 he succeeded to the Pierrepont estates and assumed by Royal sign manual the same year the surname of Pierrepont in lieu of Medows. In 1806 he was further honoured when he was created Earl Manvers. All these titles became extinct on the death of the sixth Earl Manvers in 1955.

== Barons Pierrepont; first creation (1627) ==
- Robert Pierrepont, 1st Baron Pierrepont (1584–1643) (created Earl of Kingston-upon-Hull in 1628)
- For further succession, see Earl of Kingston-upon-Hull

== Baron Pierrepont, of Ardglass, and of Hanslope; second and third creations (1702 and 1714) ==
- Gervase Pierrepont, 1st Baron Pierrepont, of Ardglass (1649–1715) (further created Baron Pierrepont, of Hanslope in 1714)

== Barons Pierrepont, of Holme Pierrepont; fourth creation (1796) ==
- Charles Pierrepont, 1st Baron Pierrepont, of Holme Pierrepont (1737–1816) (created Earl Manvers in 1806)
- For further succession, see Earl Manvers

== Family tree ==
Family tree of the Dukes of Kingston-upon-Hull, and related titles

Henry Pierrepont; 1546–1615
Viscount Newark and Baron Pierrepont (1st creation), 1627; Earl of Kingston-upon-Hull, 1628
Robert Pierrepont; 1584–1643; 1st Earl of Kingston-upon-Hull, Viscount Newark, and Baron Pierrepont
Marquess of Dorchester (1st creation), 1647
Henry Pierrepont; 1606–1680; 1st Marquess of Dorchester, 2nd Earl of Kingston-upon-Hull, Viscount Newark, and Baron Pierrepont	William Pierrepont c. 1607–1678
Marquessate of Dorchester (1st creation) extinct, 1680
Baron Pierrepont (2nd creation), of Ardglass (Ireland), 1702; Baron Pierrepont (3rd creation), of Hanslape (Great Britain), 1714
Robert Pierrepont d. 1666	Gervase Pierrepont; 1649–1715; Baron Pierrepont
Baronies extinct, 1715
Marquess of Dorchester (2nd creation), 1706, Duke of Kingston-upon-Hull, 1715
Robert Pierrepont c. 1660–1682; 3rd Earl of Kingston-upon-Hull, Viscount Newark, and Baron Pierrepont	William Pierrepont c. 1662–1690; 4th Earl of Kingston-upon-Hull, Viscount Newark, and Baron Pierrepont	Evelyn Pierrepont; 1665–1726; 1st Duke of Kingston-upon-Hull and Marquess of Dorchester, 5th Earl of Kingston-upon-Hull, Viscount Newark, and Baron Pierrepont
William Pierrepont; 1692–1713 styled Earl of Kingston-upon-Hull
Frances Pierrepont; 1711–1795	Evelyn Pierrepont; 1711–1773; 2nd Duke of Kingston-upon-Hull and Marquess of Dorchester, 6th Earl of Kingston-upon-Hull, Viscount Newark, and Baron Pierrepont
All titles extinct, 1773
Viscount Newark (2nd creation), of Newark on Trent and Baron Pierrepont (4th creation), of Holme Pierrepont in the County of Nottingham (Great Britain), 1796; Earl Manvers (United Kingdom), 1806
Charles (Medows) Pierrepont; 1737–1816; 1st Earl Manvers, Viscount Newark, and Baron Pierrepont
Evelyn Henry Fitzpatrick Pierrepont; 1775–1801	Charles Herbert Pierrepont; 1778–1860; 2nd Earl Manvers, Viscount Newark, and Baron Pierrepont
Charles Evelyn Pierrepont; 1805–1850 styled Viscount Newark	Sydney William Herbert Pierrepont; 1826–1900; 3rd Earl Manvers, Viscount Newark, and Baron Pierrepont
Charles William Sydney Pierrepont; 1854–1926; 4th Earl Manvers, Viscount Newark, and Baron Pierrepont	Evelyn Henry Pierrepont; 1856–1926
Evelyn Robert Pierrepont; 1888–1940; 5th Earl Manvers, Viscount Newark, and Baron Pierrepont	Gervas Evelyn Pierrepont; 1881–1955; 6th Earl Manvers, Viscount Newark, and Baron Pierrepont
All titles extinct, 1955
