= Evelyn Pierrepont =

Evelyn Pierrepont may refer to:

- Evelyn Pierrepont, 1st Duke of Kingston-upon-Hull (c.1655–1726)
- Evelyn Pierrepont, 2nd Duke of Kingston-upon-Hull (1711–1773)
- Evelyn Pierrepont (MP) (1775–1801)
- Evelyn Pierrepont, 5th Earl Manvers (1888–1940)
