= St Edmund's Church, Holme Pierrepont =

Church in Nottinghamshire, England

Coordinates: 52°56′45″N 01°04′12″W

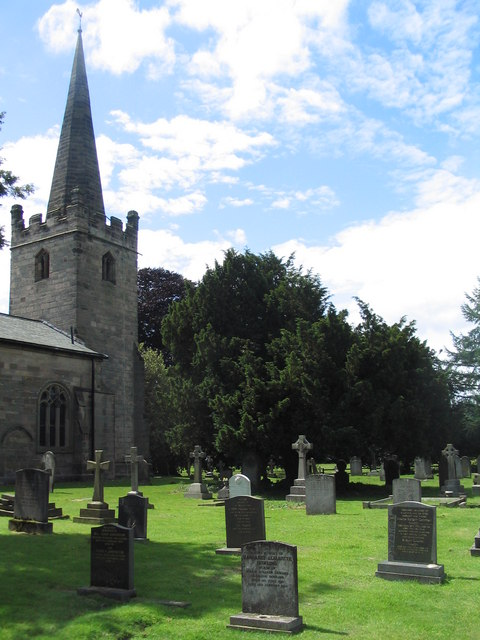
- The churchyard
- St Edmund's Church, Holme Pierrepont
- Denomination: Church of England
- Churchmanship: Broad Church

History
- Dedication: St Edmund

Administration
- Province: York
- Diocese: Southwell and Nottingham
- Parish: Holme Pierrepont

Clergy
- Vicar: Revd Dr Jonathan Mole

Listed Building – Grade I
- Official name: Church of St Edmund
- Designated: 1 December 1965
- Reference no.: 1249315

St Edmund's Church, Holme Pierrepont is a parish church in the Church of England in Holme Pierrepont, Nottinghamshire.

The church is Grade I listed by the Department for Digital, Culture, Media and Sport as a building of outstanding architectural or historic interest.

== History and features ==
The church has had a long association with Holme Pierrepont Hall.

The medieval church was largely re-built in 1666 by Henry Pierrepont, 1st Marquess of Dorchester. In 1878 Thomas Chambers Hine added the chancel.

It is now part of the combined parish of All Hallows Church, Lady Bay.

The east window of 1913 is by James Powell and Sons.

The organ was built by Charles Lloyd and won a gold medal at the Birmingham Trades Exhibition in 1865.

== Rectors ==
- John Speed, 1578–1626
- Humphrey Perkins c. 1718
- Samuel Berdmore 1719–1722, also Vicar of St Mary's Church, Nottingham
- ?
- Scrope Berdmore 1740–1770, also Vicar of St Mary's Church, Nottingham
- Thomas Donnithorne ????–1814
- James Jarvis Cleaver 1814–????
- Rev. James Jarvis Peach ????–1864?
- Henry Seymour
- Egbert Hacking c. 1908–????, also from 1913 Archdeacon of Newark
- Rev WT Saward 1913-? Nottingham Newspaper, Nov 1921
- Canon R. P. Tinsley 1959–????

== Monuments ==
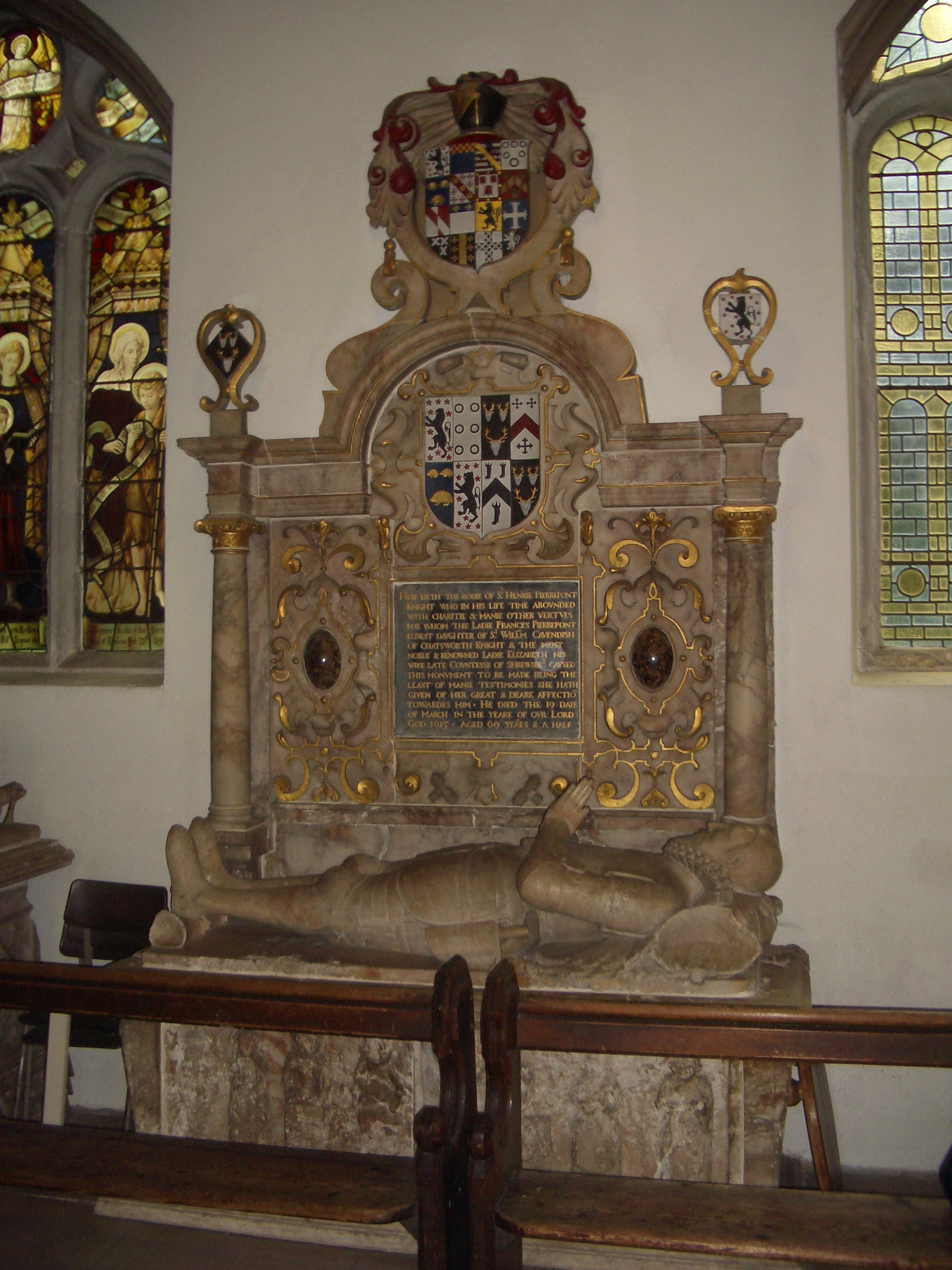
Memorial to Henry Pierrepont (died 1615)

- Sir Henry Pierrepont, died 1499.
- Sir Henry Pierrepont, died 1615, father of Earl of Kingston upon Hull and Grace, Lady Manners
- Gertrude, wife of Robert Pierrepont, 1st Earl of Kingston-upon-Hull who died in 1649.
- John Oldham (1653–1683), satirical poet and translator
- Evelyn Pierrepont (1775–1801), Member of Parliament

=== Organists ===
- Robert Bullock 1925 - ????

== See also ==
- Grade I listed buildings in Nottinghamshire
- Listed buildings in Holme Pierrepont
