= Holme Pierrepont Hall =

Grade I listed house in Nottingham, UK

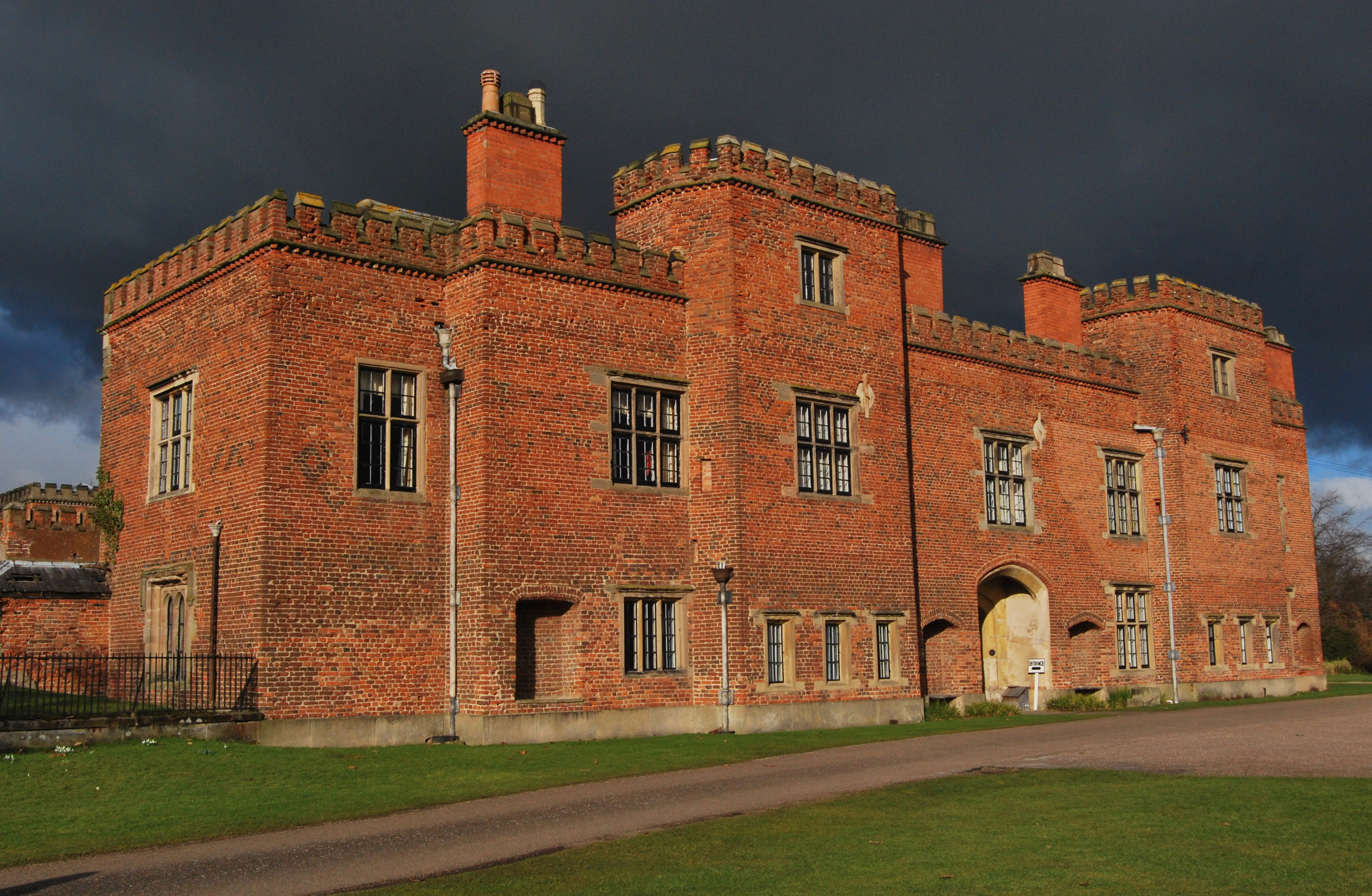
- From the front

- Location within Nottinghamshire

General information
- Location: Holme Lane, Holme Pierrepont, Nottinghamshire, NG12 2LD, England
- Coordinates: 52.947222°N 1.069444°W
- Construction started: c. 1490–1500
- Client: Sir William Pierrepont

Website
- Holme Pierrepont Hall

Listed Building – Grade I
- Official name: Holme Pierrepont Hall
- Designated: 12-Feb-1952
- Reference no.: 1249330

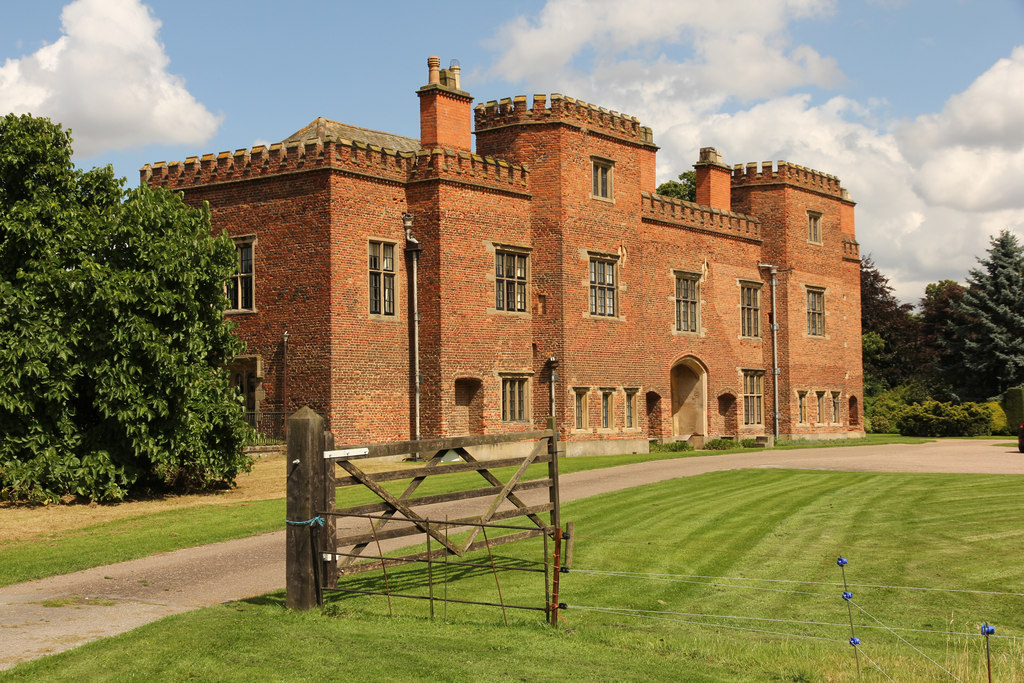
Holme Pierrepont Hall

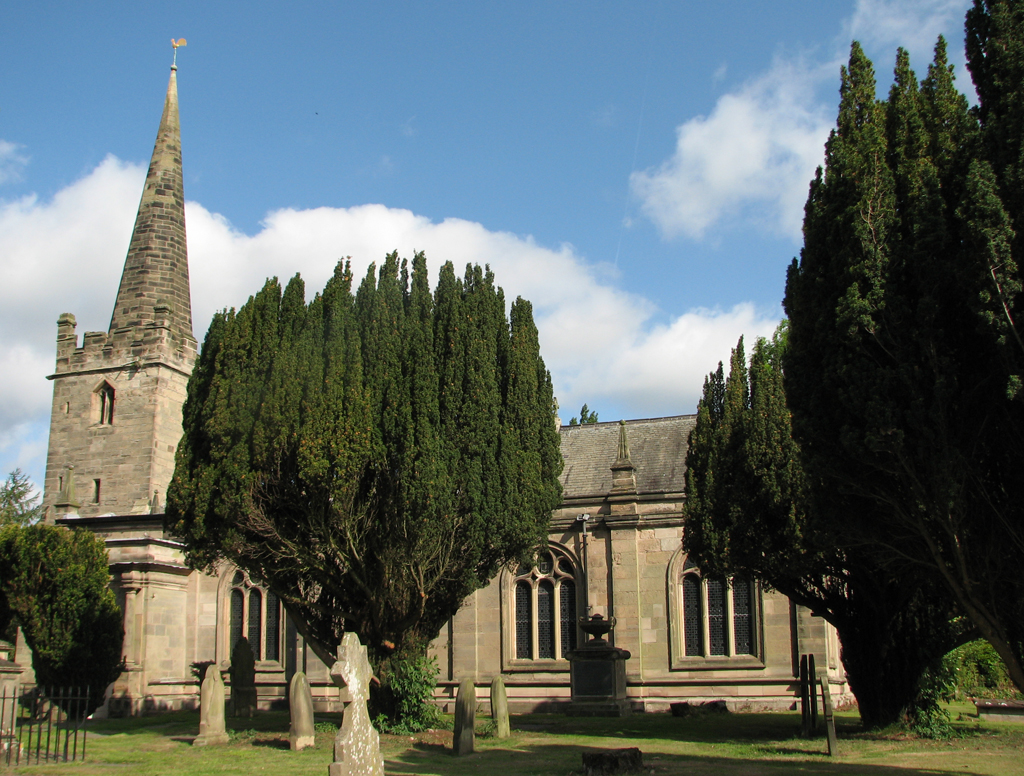
St. Edmund's Church, Holme Pierrepont

Holme Pierrepont Hall is a medieval manor house located in the village of Holme Pierrepont, near Nottingham, Nottinghamshire, England. It is a Grade I listed building, recognised for its exceptional architectural and historical significance.

Built between approximately 1490 and 1500 by Sir William Pierrepont, the hall is one of the few brick-built houses in Nottinghamshire from the period and remains in private ownership. The Pierrepont family has been associated with the property for centuries, and the hall retains many original features, including Tudor architectural elements and later additions.

The hall is situated near St. Edmund's Church, Holme Pierrepont.

== History ==
The Pierrepont family has lived at Holme Pierrepont since around 1280, following the marriage of Henry de Pierrepont to Annora de Manvers. Originally, the area was known simply as Holme, but later adopted the Pierrepont family name as a suffix.

The house was built by Sir William Pierrepont around 1500. He was succeeded by Sir George Pierrepont (d. 1564), Sir Henry Pierrepont (d. 1616), and Sir Robert Pierrepont (d. 1643), who was created the 1st Earl of Kingston-upon-Hull. The north range of the house was rebuilt by the 1st Earl in 1628. His son, Henry Pierrepont, 2nd Earl of Kingston-upon-Hull, was created Marquess of Dorchester in 1645.

The family rose further in status in 1715 when the 5th Earl was created the 1st Duke of Kingston-upon-Hull. By this time, their principal seat had become Thoresby Hall in the Dukeries area on the other side of Nottingham, which the family had acquired in 1633. Holme Pierrepont became a secondary residence and was reduced in size; the north range built by the 1st Earl was demolished around 1730.

When the Dukedom became extinct following the death of the 2nd Duke without issue in 1773, the estate passed in 1788 to his nephew, Charles Medows, a naval officer. Charles adopted the surname Pierrepont and was created the 1st Earl Manvers in 1806. The 3rd Earl rebuilt the north wing around 1870 and was succeeded by the 4th Earl.

The Hall was requisitioned for military purposes during both World Wars and was left unoccupied in the interwar period. During the Second World War, it served as a base for training young soldiers of the 70th (Young Soldiers) Sherwood Foresters. It was later reoccupied by Lady Sibell Argles, sister of the 5th Earl. After her death in 1968, the property was sold to her cousin, Mrs Elizabeth Brackenbury, who, along with her husband Robin, initiated a programme of renovation. This included the removal of exterior stucco in 1975 to reveal the original brickwork. Their son, Robert Brackenbury, now resides in a separate quarter of the house with his wife, Charlotte.

The house is set in approximately 30 acres (12 ha) of parkland.

== Current use ==
Holme Pierrepont Hall is regularly open to the public on selected days in February and March each year. Full details of opening times are available on the official website. The house also functions as a venue for weddings, corporate events, filming, and photo shoots.

Adjacent to the hall is St. Edmund's Church, Holme Pierrepont.

== See also ==
- Grade I listed buildings in Nottinghamshire
- Listed buildings in Holme Pierrepont
