= Robert Pierrepont =

Robert Pierrepont is the name of:

- Robert Pierrepont, 1st Earl of Kingston-upon-Hull (1584–1643), English nobleman
- Robert Pierrepont (MP) (c 1638–1681), Member of Parliament for Nottingham
- Robert Pierrepont, 3rd Earl of Kingston-upon-Hull (1660–1682), English peer

== See also ==
- Robert Pierpoint (disambiguation)
