= Recorder of Nottingham =

The recorder of Nottingham is the highest appointed legal officer of the Crown within the Nottingham City and Nottinghamshire County areas of England.

Judge Gregory Dickinson KC was appointed Recorder of Nottingham in 2016.

== List of recorders of Nottingham ==
- Sir Thomas Babington 1492 - 1519
- Radus Barton
- Richard Parkyns
- Henry Pierrepont appointed 1603
- Wills Fletcher
- John Holles, 2nd Earl of Clare appointed 1642
- Henry Pierrepont, 1st Marquess of Dorchester 1666 - (d. 1680)
- Henry Cavendish, 2nd Duke of Newcastle-upon-Tyne 1688 -
- William Cavendish, 1st Duke of Devonshire 1690 - (d. 1707)
- Evelyn Pierrepont, 1st Duke of Kingston-upon-Hull - 1726
- Thomas Pelham-Holles, 1st Duke of Newcastle-upon-Tyne 1726 -
- Edward Bigland
- William Bentinck, 2nd Duke of Portland
- Evelyn Pierrepont, 2nd Duke of Kingston-upon-Hull 1769 -
- Henry Pelham-Clinton, 2nd Duke of Newcastle-under-Lyne 1773-1794
- William Cavendish-Bentinck, 3rd Duke of Portland 1794–1809
- Henry Richard Vassall Fox, 3rd Lord Holland (died 1840)
- Richard Wildman 1837 - 1881
- Edward Chandos Leigh 1881 - 1909
- Judge Henry Yorke Stanger 1909 - 1911
- Sir William Ryland Dent Adkins 1911 - 1920
- Hugo J. Young 1920 - 1927
- Henry Holmes Joy 1927 - 1934
- John Frederick Eales 1934 - 1936
- Sir Albion Richardson 1936 - 1950
- Christopher Nyholm Shawcross 1950 - 1961
- Anthony Leonard Cripps 1961 - 1971
- Arthur Ellis 1974 -1991
- Judge Michael Stokes QC 2007 - 2016
- Judge Gregory Dickinson QC 2016 - 2022
- Her Honour Judge Nirmal Shant KC 2022 -
