= Gervase Pierrepont, Baron Pierrepont =

English politician

Gervase Pierrepont, 1st Baron Pierrepont (1649 – 22 May 1715), was an English politician.

Pierrepont was the younger son of William Pierrepont, second son of Robert Pierrepont, 1st Earl of Kingston-upon-Hull. His mother was Elizabeth, daughter of Sir Thomas Harries, 1st Baronet, of Tong Castle, Shropshire. He was the uncle of Robert Pierrepont, 3rd Earl of Kingston-upon-Hull, William Pierrepont, 4th Earl of Kingston-upon-Hull, and Evelyn Pierrepont, 1st Duke of Kingston-upon-Hull.

Pierrepont was returned to Parliament as one of two representatives for Appleby in 1698, a seat he held until 1705. In 1702 he was raised to the Peerage of Ireland as Baron Pierrepont, of Ardglass. This creation in the Peerage of Ireland allowed him, although a new lord, to remain in the House of Commons. In 1714 he was further honoured when he was made Baron Pierrepont, of Hanslape in the County of Buckingham, in the Peerage of Great Britain, with this creation giving him an automatic seat in the House of Lords.

Lord Pierrepont married Lucy Pelham, daughter of Sir John Pelham, 3rd Baronet, in 1680. He died in May 1715 when the baronies became extinct. Lady Pierrepont died in July 1721.

Parliament of England
Preceded by Sir Christopher Musgrave, Bt; Sir John Walter, Bt	Member of Parliament for Appleby; 1698–1705; With: Sir John Walter, Bt 1698–1701; Wharton Dunch 1701–1702; James Grahme 1702–1705	Succeeded by James Grahme; William Harvey
Peerage of Ireland
New creation	Baron Pierrepont; 1702–1715	Extinct
Peerage of Great Britain
New creation	Baron Pierrepont; 1714–1715	Extinct
