= Pierrepont House, Nottingham =

Pierrepont House
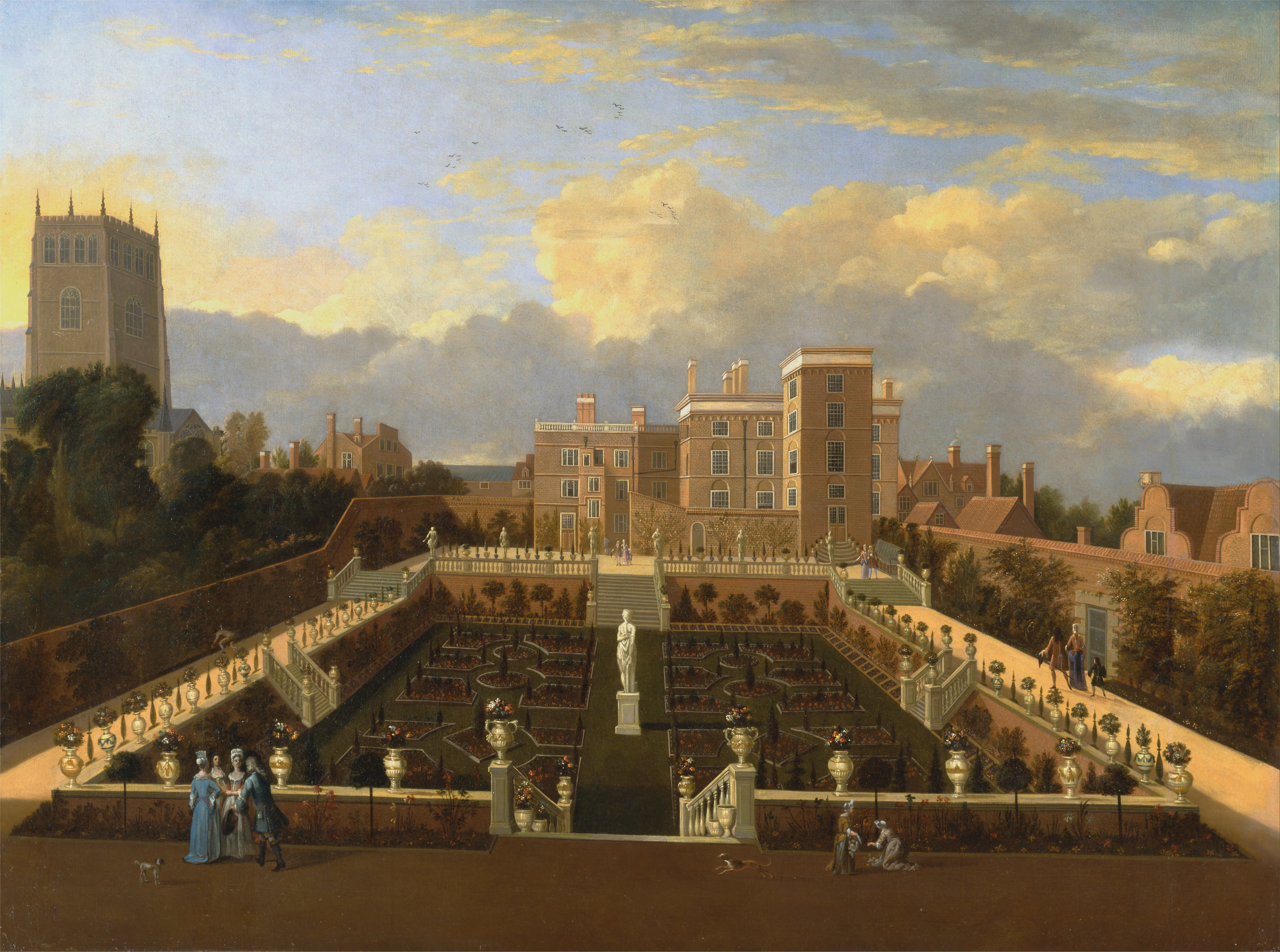
- Pierrepont House ca. 1705, a painting in the Paul Mellon Collection at the Yale Centre for British Art

- Location within Nottingham

General information
- Location: Nottingham, England
- Coordinates: 52°57′7″N 1°08′33.6″W

Pierrepont House was the home of the Pierrepont family located on what is now Stoney Street, Nottingham.

The elevation on Stoney Street in Nottingham was constructed in the mid seventeenth century by Francis Pierrepont, third son of Robert Pierrepont, 1st Earl of Kingston-upon-Hull. The Lay Subsidy Roll of 1674 lists those liable for the hearth tax. The largest in Nottingham was Thurland House with 47, and Pierrepont house was next with 23.

The house was sold by 1797 to Thomas Curtis and James Bellamy and converted for use as a fabric workshop. The buildings were demolished at the start of the 19th century and replaced.
