= Pierpoint =

Pierpoint may refer to:

== Places ==
- Pierpoint, California, USA

== People ==
- Charles Pierpoint (1795-?), English athlete in cricket
- Eric Pierpoint (born 1950), United States actor
- Folliott Sandford Pierpoint (1835–1917), English hymnist and poet
- Katherine Pierpoint (born 1961), English poet
- Powell Pierpoint (1922–1998), United States lawyer, General Counsel of the Army
- Richard Pierpoint (c1744-c1837), Bondu-born participant in the American Revolution
- Robert Pierpoint (journalist) (1925–2011), United States broadcast journalist
- Robert Pierpoint (Vermont politician) (1791–1864), United States political figure and co-founder of a life-insurance company
- Roy Pierpoint (born 1929), British racing driver
- Thomas Pierpoint (1789–1849), English cricketer

== See also ==
- Pierpont (disambiguation)
- Pierrepoint (disambiguation)
