= William Newcome (cricketer) =

English clergyman and cricketer

William Cyril Newcome (1813 – 19 March 1897) was an English clergyman and a cricketer who played in a single match for Cambridge University in 1836 that has since been judged to have been first-class. He was born at Litcham, Norfolk and died at Feltwell Hall, also in Norfolk. The precise date of his birth is not known, but he was baptised at Litcham on 19 October 1813; his second name is spelled as "Cyrill" in the baptismal record.

Newcome was educated at Eton College and at Trinity College, Cambridge. He appeared as an opening batsman in a trial match for the university cricket at Cambridge in 1836 and, though not successful, was picked for the team to play the Marylebone Cricket Club, where he batted at No 10 and scored 7 in his only innings. It is not known whether he batted right- or left-handed; full bowling figures for his single first-class match are not available, but there is no sign from that game nor from later minor matches played by Newcome that he bowled. Among minor matches in which he featured later were games played against the All England Eleven by a 22-strong side representing Lincolnshire.

Newcome graduated from Cambridge University with a Bachelor of Arts degree in 1837, upgrading to a Master of Arts in 1843. He was ordained as a Church of England priest and became curate at Hanslope in Buckinghamshire until 1846, when he was appointed rector of Boothby Pagnell in Lincolnshire. He remained there for 50 years, retiring in late 1896 to his house at Feltwell where he died a few months later. Aside from cricket, Newcome had other sporting interests, including fishing and hawking, but especially hunting: "He followed it with unremitting zest (though never allowing it to interfere with his clerical duties), through the long term of his residence at Boothby, with the Belvoir and other packs in the neighbourhood, no day being too long or distance too far for him."
