= Listed buildings in Holme Pierrepont =

Holme Pierrepont is a civil parish in the Rushcliffe district of Nottinghamshire, England. The parish contains eleven listed buildings that are recorded in the National Heritage List for England. Of these, two are listed at Grade I, the highest of the three grades, one is at Grade II*, the middle grade, and the others are at Grade II, the lowest grade. The two most important buildings in the parish are St Edmund's Church and Holme Pierrepont Hall, both of which are listed at Grade I. Associated with them are listed buildings in the churchyard of the church and in the grounds of the hall, and further afield are two listed farmhouses.

== Key ==
Grade	Criteria
I	Buildings of exceptional interest, sometimes considered to be internationally important
II*	Particularly important buildings of more than special interest
II	Buildings of national importance and special interest

== Buildings ==
Name and location	Photograph	Date	Notes	Grade
St Edmund's Church; 52.94689°N 1.06958°W		13th century	The church has been altered and expanded through the centuries, it was much rebuilt in about 1666, restored in 1878 by T. C. Hine, and there have been later changes. The church is built in stone with slate roofs, and consists of a nave, a south aisle, a south porch, a south organ chamber, a chancel and a west steeple. The steeple has a tower with diagonal buttresses, a moulded plinth, a south arched doorway with a moulded surround, stair lights, two-light bell openings, the remains of three gargoyles, an embattled parapet with corner finials, and a recessed spire. On the aisle is a cornice and obelisk pinnacles with ball finials.	I
Holme Pierrepont Hall; 52.94702°N 1.06873°W		Early 16th century	A large country house that has been altered through the centuries, it is in red brick with some blue brick chequering and diapering, stone dressing, coped embattled parapets and hipped slate roofs. There is a U-shaped plan, with a south range of two storeys and twelve bays, two of the bays projecting and forming three-storey towers. On the front is a rendered four-centred arch with a chamfered surround, and a doorway with a similar surround. Flanking this are niches with four-centred arched heads, and two similar niches in outer bays. Most of the windows are casements with mullion, transoms and hood moulds. The east range has 15 bays, and on the north side of the courtyard is an arcade.	I
Wall and gazebo, Holme Pierrepont Hall; 52.94797°N 1.06686°W	—	Early 17th century	The wall is in red brick with moulded stone coping. It runs from west to east for about 125 metres (410 ft), then turns at right angles to the south for about 75 metres (246 ft), ending in a red brick pier with stone coping and an urn finial. In the angle is a gazebo with a slate roof and an arched entrance. The north wall contains two doorways, and in the east wall is a gateway.	II*
Memorial southwest of the tower 52.94672°N 1.06982°W	—	Late 18th century	The memorial in the churchyard of St Edmund's Church is to members of the Beckwith family. It is in stone, and has a plinth carrying a panelled square chest. On the east side is an inscribed tablet, and on the moulded top is a decorative urn.	II
Memorial south of the aisle 52.94669°N 1.06941°W		1795	The memorial in the churchyard of St Edmund's Church is to members of the Sunday family. It is in stone, and has a plinth carrying a tall rectangular chest flanked by similar smaller fluted chests. On the front and the rear of the central chest are tablets, and on each chest is a pyramidal roof.	II
Memorial south of the organ chamber 52.94681°N 1.06938°W		1802	The memorial in the churchyard of St Edmund's Church is to Francis Dort de le Borde, a French refugee. It is in stone, and has a plinth carrying a rectangular chest decorated with scrolls and moulding. On the south side is a slate tablet, and on the top is a large decorative stone urn.	II
Hall Cottage and Estate Office; 52.94688°N 1.06606°W	—	c. 1810	The cottage and office are in rendered red brick, they have slate roofs with overhanging eaves, and contain casement windows. The cottage has two storeys and three bays, and to the left is a single-story single-bay wing. The office to the right has a single storey and two bays, and at the junction of the two parts is a single-storey five-bay outbuilding.	II
Holly Lodge; 52.94531°N 1.07256°W	—	Early 19th century	The lodge is in whitewashed brick with dentilled eaves and a slate roof. The main range has two storeys and two bays, to the left is a single storey three-bay wing, and to the right is a single-storey single-bay wing with a tile roof. The windows are casements with Gothic glazing bars.	II
Holme House; 52.93760°N 1.06386°W		Early 19th century	A farmhouse in rendered brick on a stone plinth, with a hipped slate roof and overhanging eaves. There are two storeys and five bays, and a recessed lower two-storey single-bay wing on the right. In the centre is a porch on a plinth, with pilasters, a cornice and a parapet, and a door with a fanlight, and the windows are sashes.	II
Simkins Farmhouse; 52.93880°N 1.10946°W		Early 19th century	The farmhouse is in rendered red brick, and has a hipped slate roof with wide eaves. There are two storeys and an L-shaped plan, with four bays on the front and the right side. In the centre is a porch with a hipped roof and entrances on the sides, and an arched doorway. The windows are casements with Gothick glazing bars, and Tudor-style hood moulds.	II
Lychgate, St Edmund's Church; 52.94658°N 1.06941°W		1921	The lych gate at the entrance to the churchyard was built as a war memorial. It consists of two walls with a timber superstructure, and a gabled slate roof with pendants and sprocketed eaves. At each corner is a carved grotesque head, and the lych gate contains a pair of wooden and iron gates.	II
