= Pierrepoint =

Pierrepoint may refer to:

- Albert Pierrepoint (1905–1992), British executioner
- Henry Pierrepoint (1877–1922), British executioner, father of Albert
- Thomas Pierrepoint (1870–1954), British executioner, brother of Henry
- Pierrepoint (film), British 2005 film about Albert Pierrepoint

== See also ==
- Pierpoint (disambiguation)
- Pierrepont (disambiguation)
