= Robert Pierpoint =

Robert Pierpoint may refer to:

- Robert Pierpoint (journalist) (1925–2011), American broadcast journalist
- Robert Pierpoint (British politician) (1845–1932), member of parliament for Warrington
- Robert Pierpoint (Vermont politician) (1791–1864), Vermont politician and lawyer

== See also ==
- Robert Pierrepont (disambiguation)
