= Sir Thomas Harries, 1st Baronet =

Member of the Parliament of England

Sir Thomas Harries or Harris, 1st Baronet (1550 – 18 February 1628) was an English lawyer.

Harries was born in 1550, the eldest of four sons of John Harries, of Cruckton in Shropshire. His mother was Eleanor, daughter of Thomas Prowde of Sutton. Thomas Harries is believed to be the Thomas Harris who was member of parliament for Shrewsbury in 1586. Another possibility is that it was Thomas Harris of Boreatton, also a resident of Shrewsbury, and who like Harries was also a member of Lincoln's Inn. Thomas Harris of Boreatton was created a baronet at about the same time as Thomas Harries, making precise identification difficult. The History of Parliament however considers this Thomas Harries as the most likely candidate as the MP.

Harries was educated at Shrewsbury School from 1565, and later at Clement's Inn and then Lincoln's Inn from 1575. He was called to the bar at Lincoln's Inn in 1583. He was active in legal affairs in Shrewsbury, and helped in the securing of a new town charter in 1584. He contested the Parliamentary seat for Shrewsbury that year, but was defeated, coming third in the poll. He was returned unopposed in 1586.

He became a serjeant-at-law in February 1604. He became a bencher at Lincoln's Inn in 1596, and was possibly the Thomas Harris who was appointed justice of the peace of Shropshire c. 1600, and Cheshire in 1601. In 1613 he bought Tong Castle from Sir Edward Stanley, and on 12 April 1623 was created a baronet, of Tong Castle.

Escutcheon of Sir Thomas Harries, 1st Baronet

He was married to Eleanor, daughter of Roger Giffard, physician to Queen Elizabeth I. The couple had one son, Francis, and three daughters, but Francis and one of the daughters predeceased their father, and the baronetcy became extinct on Sir Thomas's death on 18 February 1628. Tong Castle passed to the family of his daughter Elizabeth, who married William Pierrepont; in 1764 Evelyn Pierrepont, 2nd Duke of Kingston-upon-Hull sold it to George Durant. Sir Thomas's second daughter, Anne, married the jurist John Wilde.

Parliament of England
Preceded by Thomas Owen; Richard Barker	Member of Parliament for Shrewsbury; 1586–1587; With: Reginald Scriven	Succeeded by Reginald Scriven; Andrew Newport
Baronetage of England
New creation	Baronet (of Tong Castle); 1623–1628	Extinct
