= Pierpont =

Pierpont may refer to:

== Surname ==
- Francis Harrison Pierpont (1814–1899), Governor of Virginia
- Harry Pierpont (1902–1934), Prohibition-era gangster
- James Pierpont (minister) (1659–1714), founder of Yale University
- James Lord Pierpont (1822–1893), musician and soldier
- James Pierpont (mathematician) (1866–1938), American mathematician
- John Pierpont (1785–1866), American poet, teacher, lawyer, merchant, and minister
- Lena Pierpont (1883–1958), Prohibition-era figure
- Marie de Pierpont (1844-1896), French composer
- Pierpont (Australian Financial Review) (born 1937), alter-ego of Trevor Sykes, financial journalist

== Middle name ==
- John Pierpont Morgan (1837–1913), American financier and banker
- John Pierpont Morgan, Jr. (1867–1943), American banker, finance executive, and philanthropist
- Samuel Pierpont Langley (1834–1906), American astronomer, and physicist, inventor

== Places in the United States ==
- Pierpont, South Dakota
- Pierpont, Ohio
- Pierpont Township, Ashtabula County, Ohio
- Pierpont, Missouri
- Pierpont, Monongalia County, West Virginia
- Pierpont, Wyoming County, West Virginia

== Educational institution ==
- Pierpont Community and Technical College, West Virginia

== See also ==
- Pierrepont (disambiguation)
