= Duke of Kingston's Regiment of Light Horse =

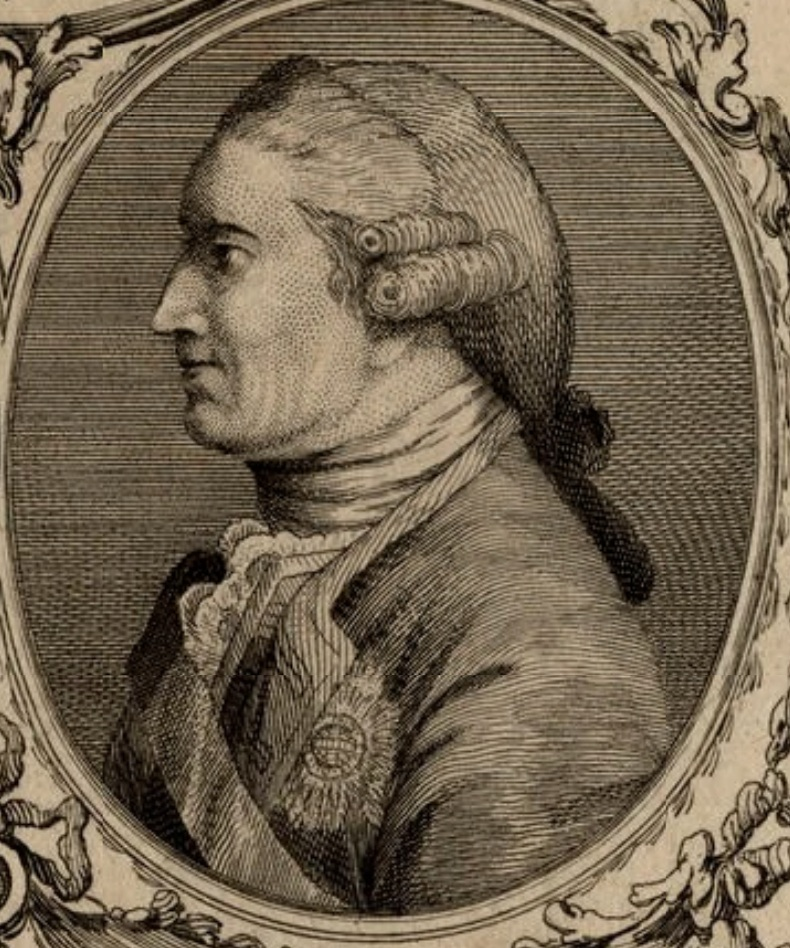
The Duke of Kingston-upon-Hull, who raised the regiment

The Duke of Kingston's Regiment of Light Horse was a light cavalry regiment of the British Army. It was raised in Nottinghamshire in 1745 by Evelyn Pierrepont, 2nd Duke of Kingston-upon-Hull at his own expense, and was modelled after the hussars of Central Europe. Ranked as the 10th Regiment of Horse, the regiment fought in the suppression of the Jacobite rising of 1745, seeing action at the Battle of Culloden. Since they were newly raised and the troopers weren't regulars the unit behaved in a less disciplined manner, especially after Culloden when they cut down some civilians including women and children along the Inverness road while pursuing retreating Jacobite troops. The men had enlisted for the duration of the fighting, and so the regiment was disbanded at Nottingham in September 1746, with Prince William, Duke of Cumberland enlisting most of the men (all but eight of the original) into the newly formed Duke of Cumberland's Regiment of Light Dragoons.
