= Castlethorpe Castle =

Castle in Buckinghamshire, England

- Shown within Buckinghamshire
- Interactive map of Castlethorpe Castle
- 52.0940°N 0.8366°W
- Type: Motte and bailey
- Location: Buckinghamshire, England
- Nearest city: Milton Keynes

History
- Built: 12th century
- Demolished: 1218
- Event: First Barons' War

Site notes
- Condition: Visible earthworks

Castlethorpe Castle stood in the village of Castlethorpe, to the north of Milton Keynes, Buckinghamshire.

This was originally a motte and bailey castle with a timber structure built by Winemar, the Flemish Lord of Hanslope in the 12th Century. It was at that time known as Hanslope Castle. The castle was destroyed in 1215 by Faulkes de Breauté during the First Barons' War and was never rebuilt.

It is a scheduled monument, although only earthworks remain, with no traces of masonry.

== Location ==
Castlethorpe Castle stood in the village of Castlethorpe, which was part of the manor of Hanslope in mediaeval times. It is situated to the north of Milton Keynes, Buckinghamshire.

== History ==
Castlethorpe Castle belonged to lord of Hanslope and was constructed in the 12th century, or possibly slightly earlier. In 1066 William I granted the manor of Hanslope to Winemar the Fleming, who built the fortifications. In 1086 it was in the hundred of Bunsty and ownership was the same. During the reign of Henry I it was the baronial castle of Winemar's descendant William Mauduit, chamberlain to the king. During period known as The Anarchy (1138–1153) the Mauduit family, who owned the castle at that time, supported Empress Matilda against King Stephen.

In disputes between King John and the barons, Robert Mauduit sided with the barons against the king. In the autumn of 1215 Faulkes de Breauté, general of King John, attacked the castle and destroyed it, taking the manor of Hanslope. Although Robert Mauduit eventually regained the manor the castle was never rebuilt.

The Anglo Saxon name Castlethorpe means “farm or secondary settlement of the castle”.

== Layout ==
The site consists of 36-foot (11 m) high motte (large mound of earth), on which a timber keep once stood. This is on the south of the inner bailey (flat enclosure) of 4 acres (1.6 ha), which is surrounded by an outer bailey and ditches up to 60 feet (18 m) wide and a bank. The family probably lived in hall within the inner bailey, which has entrances on the west and northwest.

== See also ==
- Castles in Great Britain and Ireland
- List of castles in England
