= Francis Pierrepont (Roundhead) =

English politician

Francis Pierrepont (died 1659) was an English politician who sat in the House of Commons in 1640. He fought in the Parliamentary army in the English Civil War.

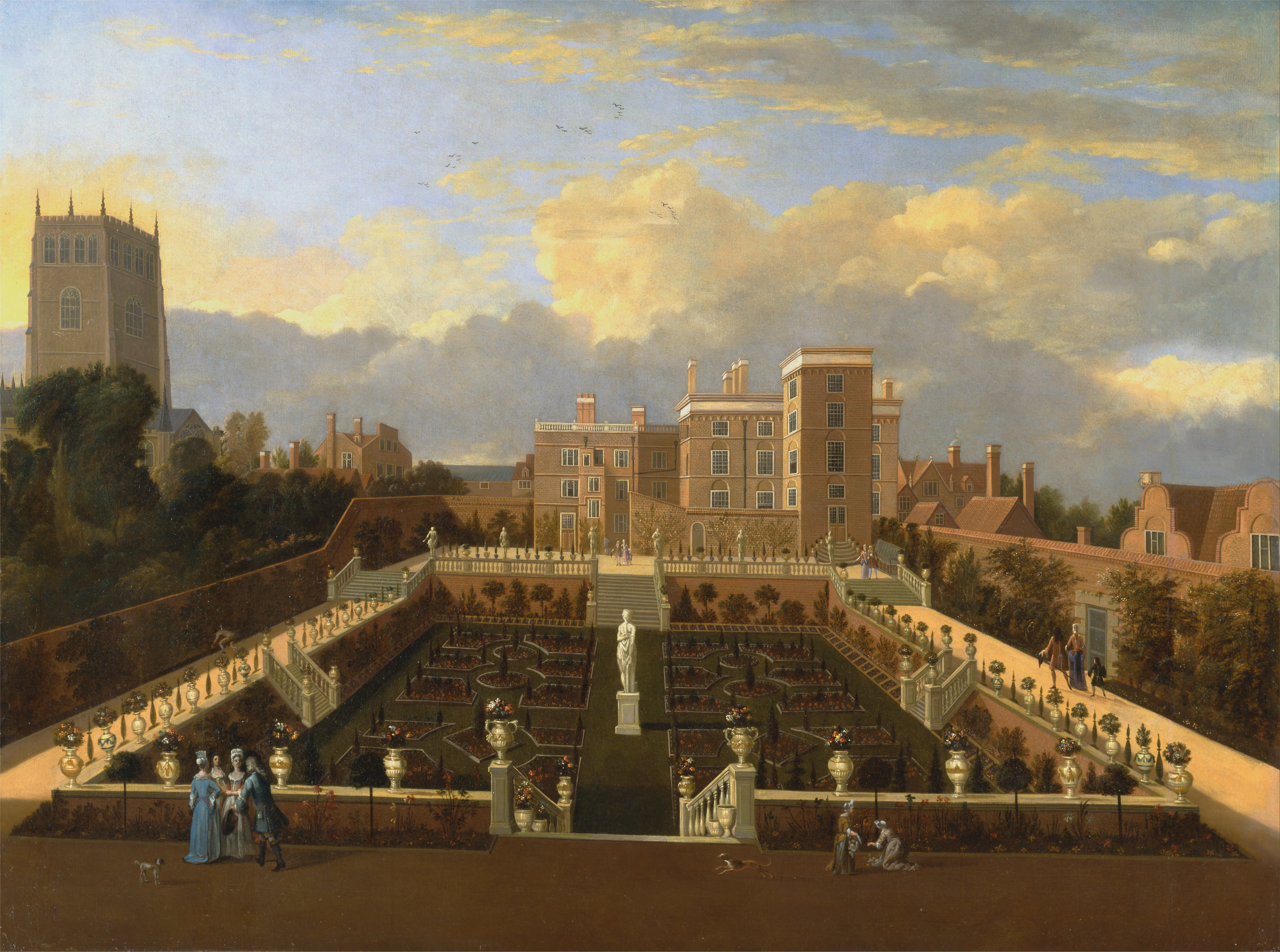
Pierrepont House c.1705

Pierrepont was the third son of Robert Pierrepont, 1st Earl of Kingston-upon-Hull and his wife Gertrude Talbot, daughter of Henry Talbot.

In April 1640, Pierrepont was elected Member of Parliament for East Retford in the Short Parliament. In the Civil War, Pierrepont raised a regiment of Nottinghamshire Trained Bands in Nottingham for the parliamentary army of which he became Colonel. In 1645 he was elected MP for Nottingham in the Long Parliament.

He built Pierrepont House in Nottingham in the mid-17th century.

Pierrepont died in 1659. He had married Elizabeth Bray, daughter of Thomas Bray, of Eyam, Derbyshire, and had issue. His eldest son was Robert, who became an MP for Nottingham. His daughter Frances married William Paget, 6th Baron Paget.

== Notes ==
Parliament of England
Parliament suspended since 1629	Member of Parliament for East Retford; 1640; With: Sir Gervase Clifton, 1st Baronet	Succeeded by Sir Gervase Clifton, 1st Baronet; Viscount Mansfield
Preceded by Gilbert Millington; William Stanhope	Member of Parliament for Nottingham; 1645–1652; With: Gilbert Millington	Not represented in Barebones Parliament
