= Gertrude Pierrepont, Countess of Kingston-upon-Hull =

English noblewoman (1580–1649)

Gertrude Pierrepont, Countess of Kingston-upon-Hull (29 September 1580 – 1649), born Gertrude Talbot, was an English noblewoman and peeress, the wife of Robert Pierrepont, 1st Earl of Kingston-upon-Hull, and the daughter of the Honourable Henry Talbot, and his wife, the former Elizabeth Reyner.

Henry Talbot was a younger son of George Talbot, 6th Earl of Shrewsbury, and Gertrude was his elder daughter and co-heir. She married Pierrepont at Kinwalton Church, on 8 January 1601, and he was created a Viscount in 1627, and an Earl in 1628.

Their children included:

- Henry Pierrepont, 1st Marquess of Dorchester (1606–1680), who married, first, Cecilia Bayning, by whom he had children, and secondly, Lady Catherine Stanley
- Francis Pierrepont (died 1658 or 1659), who married Elizabeth Bray and had children
- William Pierrepont (1607/8–1679), who married Elizabeth Harries and had children
- Gervas Pierrepont (named as responsible for her monument), who died unmarried
- Lady Elizabeth Pierrepont, who died unmarried
- Lady Frances Pierrepont (born 1615), who married Philip Rolleston and had children
- George Pierrepont, who married and had children
- Mary, who died in infancy

The Earl of Kingston was killed by friendly fire in 1643, while fighting for King Charles I of England in the English Civil War. The couple's eldest son, Henry, was created a Marquess in 1645. The Countess died, aged 68, and a memorial was erected by her son at St Edmund's Church, Holme Pierrepont, near the family seat; it describes her as "replete with all the qualities that adorn her sex; and more eminent in them than in the greatness of her birth...."
