= Hanslope =

Civil parish in the City of Milton Keynes, England

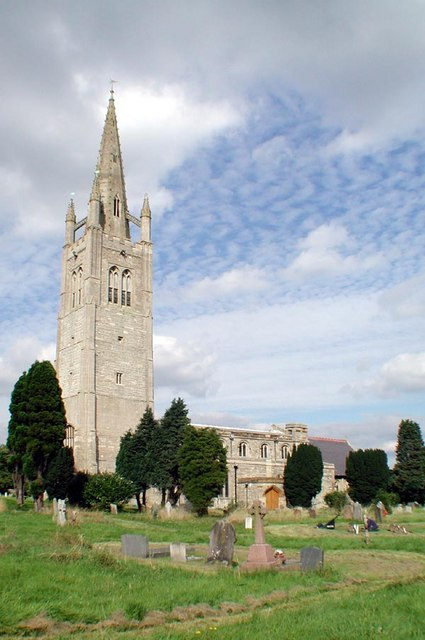
- St. James the Great parish church

- Location within Buckinghamshire
- Interactive map of Hanslope
- Population: 2,731 (2021 census)
  - Density: 1.3/ha
- OS grid reference: SP8046
- Civil parish: Hanslope
- District: City of Milton Keynes
- Unitary authority: Milton Keynes City Council
- Ceremonial county: Buckinghamshire
- Region: South East
- Country: England
- Sovereign state: United Kingdom
- Post town: MILTON KEYNES
- Postcode district: MK19
- Dialling code: 01908
- Police: Thames Valley
- Fire: Buckinghamshire
- Ambulance: South Central
- UK Parliament: Milton Keynes North
- Website: https://www.hanslopeparishcouncil.org/

Hanslope is a village and civil parish in the unitary authority area of the City of Milton Keynes, Buckinghamshire, England. The village is about 4 miles (6.4 km) west northwest of Newport Pagnell, about 4 miles (6.4 km) north of Stony Stratford and 8 miles (13 km) north of Central Milton Keynes. The northern parish boundary is part of the county boundary with Northamptonshire.

The West Coast Main Line between London Euston and Glasgow passes through the western part of the parish, just over 1 mile (1.6 km) west of the village.

== Toponymy ==
The name of the village has evolved over the centuries. In the 11th century, it was variously spelt Hammescle, Hanslepe or Anslepe. In the 13th century, it was Hameslepe or Hamslape, and the latter form continued in use into the 14th century. It was Hanslopp in the 15th century and Hanslap or Anslope in the 16th century. Anslap, Anslapp and Hanslapp were used early in the 18th century and Hanslape was used in the 19th century. The toponym's etymology is from the Old English for a slippery or muddy place belonging to Haema, or possibly "hemmed-in land at the slope".

== History ==
Hanslope was included in the grant of land to the Norman Maudit (or Mauduit) family by William the Conqueror following the Norman Conquest and the family's seat was Hanslope Castle, which later became Castlethorpe. In the Domesday Book of 1086, the manor was assessed 10 hides and held by Winemar. On 28 November 1215, the castle was captured after William Maudit had started a rebellion against King John and was defeated in battle by the king's men, who were led by Falkes de Bréauté. The castle building has been lost but the grassy mounds of the motte and bailey earthworks survive. After King John's death, Maudit reclaimed his seat and founded a great park in the parish, remnants of which still survive in Hanslope. Isabel Mauduit was the mother of William de Beauchamp, 9th Earl of Warwick (1237–98). From 1293 the Earl was chartered to have a weekly market in Hanslope on Thursdays and a three-day annual market on the eve, day and morrow of the feast of St. James the Great (24, 25 and 26 July).

In the Middle Ages the parish was part of Salcey Forest and Hanslope Park was originally a medieval deer park. Much later, the park was landscaped by Humphry Repton before 1794.

Hanslope was a centre of Buckinghamshire lacemaking in the 19th century. Early in the 19th century, Hanslope lace was noted as being particularly fine, and in 1862 about 500 women and children in the parish were employed making pillow lace.

=== Listed buildings and structures ===
The parish has one scheduled monument, one grade I listed building, and 33 grade II listed buildings.

== Governance ==
Hanslope has been part of the Borough (now City) of Milton Keynes since 1973, which has been a unitary authority since 1997. This gives Milton Keynes City Council the responsibility for the provision of most local government services. Voters registered in Hanslope are represented on MK City Council, which has (since 2014) been divided into 19 wards each carrying 3 councillors with Hanslope being part of the Newport Pagnell North and Hanslope ward. Between 2002 and 2021, the ward of Newport Pagnell North and Hanslope had a single representative that was voted in every four years and always returned a Conservative councillor.

At the parish level, Hanslope has a parish council based at the village's Recreation Ground on Castlethorpe Road.

For the purposes of representation in the House of Commons, Hanslope was part of the Milton Keynes North East constituency from 1992 until its abolition in 2010 and Hanslope has since sat within the Milton Keynes North constituency.

== Geology ==
Hanslope is conveniently close to quarries for Great Oolite limestone, which has been used in the parish's traditional vernacular architecture.

== Landmarks ==
=== Parish church ===
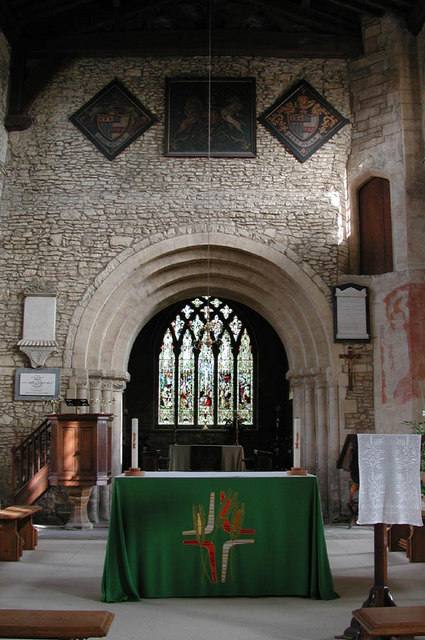
The chancel arch of St. James the Great parish church is Norman. The five-light east window is 13th century but its present intersecting tracery is a modern replacement.

The Church of England parish church of St. James the Great was originally a Norman building, established as a dependent chapelry of Castlethorpe. Later St. James the Great became the parish's principal church, with Castlethorpe as its dependent chapel.

The Perpendicular Gothic church spire is a prominent feature of the village and surrounding landscape. It was originally built early in the 15th century and was 200 feet (61 m) high. In 1804 it collapsed after being struck by lightning and afterwards it was rebuilt to the slightly lesser height of 186 feet (57 m). However, it is still the tallest in Buckinghamshire. The church has an open day each summer, when the tower is open to the public.

The spire can be seen for long distances across the low-lying countryside. In 1722, when the spire was 200 feet high, the antiquarian Thomas Hearne, who was a friend of John Knibb, wrote that Knibb "...told me he hath seen Anslapp spire in Bucks from Brill...". This is a distance of just over 22 miles (35 km).

William Newcome was ordained as a Church of England priest and became curate at Hanslope in Buckinghamshire until 1846, when he was appointed rector of Boothby Pagnell in Lincolnshire.

One notable incumbent was James Mayne MA who was rector from 1841 to 1851, previously curate of St Matthew's, Bethnal Green. In series 5 of the Who Do You Think You Are? television programme, Patsy Kensit discovered that he was one of her ancestors and was shown his grave during a visit to the church.

The church is a Grade I listed building, the highest level of designation.

=== Hanslope Park ===
About half a mile south-east of the village is Hanslope Park. Once the manorial estate of the village, it is now owned by the UK Foreign, Commonwealth and Development Office, and is home to HM Government Communications Centre.

== Transport ==
=== Road ===
Hanslope is served by the 33 bus which has Northampton and Central Milton Keynes as opposite ends of its routes and also passes through Wootton, Quinton, Roade, Ashton, Hartwell, Castlethorpe, Haversham, Wolverton and Bradwell, running approximately hourly from Monday to Saturday and does not run on Sundays or public holidays.

=== Rail ===
Hanslope does not have its own railway station. Until 1964, it was served by Castlethorpe railway station, about 2 miles (3.2 km) away. At present, the nearest stations are Wolverton and Milton Keynes Central.

==== Hanslope Junction ====
The four-track West Coast Main Line passes about 1 mile (1.6 km) south-west of the village, northwest-/southeast-bound. To the north of Hanslope, just north of the former Roade railway station, the line divides. Two tracks go directly to Rugby and the other two form the Northampton Loop Line to Northampton. Most fast [intercity] trains are on the Rugby route and can continue without changing tracks; the same is true of slower commuter trains taking the Northampton route.

Hanslope Junction (at 52.1183°N 0.86028°W, roughly midway between Roade and Castlethorpe) is the point where trains may cross between the mainline and the loop tracks, under signal control. In the chainage notation traditionally used on the railway, its location on the line is 56 miles 65 chains (56.81 mi; 91.43 km) from Euston.

== Notable people ==
In 1316, the Crown official and judge Adam de Harvington was given the living of Hanslope. He became England's Chancellor of the Exchequer in 1327.

In 1697 the distinguished clockmaker Joseph Knibb (1640–1711) retired from London to Hanslope, acquiring Green End Farm with a total of about 230 acres (93 ha) of land. Despite his retirement, he continued at Hanslope to make clocks, some of which survive. His will, proved in 1712 left his Hanslope property to his younger brother John Knibb (1650–1722), who was a notable clockmaker in Oxford. However, John kept his business in Oxford and only one clock marked "John Knibb Hanslapp" is known. Green End Farmhouse predated the Knibbs' ownership of the farm and was a scheduled monument under the Town and Country Planning Act 1947. Despite this protection its last owner demolished the historic house in 1954.

In 1714, Gervase Pierrepont, 1st Baron Pierrepont was made Baron Pierrepont of Hanslope in the County of Buckingham, in the Peerage of Great Britain, with this creation giving him an automatic seat in the House of Lords. On his death on 22 May 1715, the barony became extinct, but the title Baron Pierrepont has been used twice since in other parts of the country.

Walter Drawbridge Crick was born in Hanslope on 15 December 1857. He was an English businessman (shoemaker), amateur geologist and palaeontologist who published with Charles Darwin. He was the grandfather of Francis Crick, the molecular geneticist.

== Sources ==
- Beeson, C.F.C. (1989) [1962]. Simcock, A.V (ed.). Clockmaking in Oxfordshire 1400–1850 (3rd ed.). Oxford: Museum of the History of Science. pp. 8, 118, 120, 122–125, 184–186. ISBN 0-903364-06-9.
- Page, W.H., ed. (1927). "Parishes : Hanslope with Castle Thorpe". A History of the County of Buckingham, Volume 4. Victoria County History. pp. 348–362.
- Pevsner, Nikolaus (1960). Buckinghamshire. The Buildings of England. Harmondsworth: Penguin Books. pp. 155–156. ISBN 0-14-071019-1.
- Reed, Michael (1979). Hoskins, W.G.; Millward, Roy (eds.). The Buckinghamshire Landscape. The Making of the English Landscape. London: Hodder & Stoughton. pp. 125, 130, 136, 159, 190. ISBN 0-340-19044-2.
