= William Pierrepont (politician) =

17th-century English parliamentarian

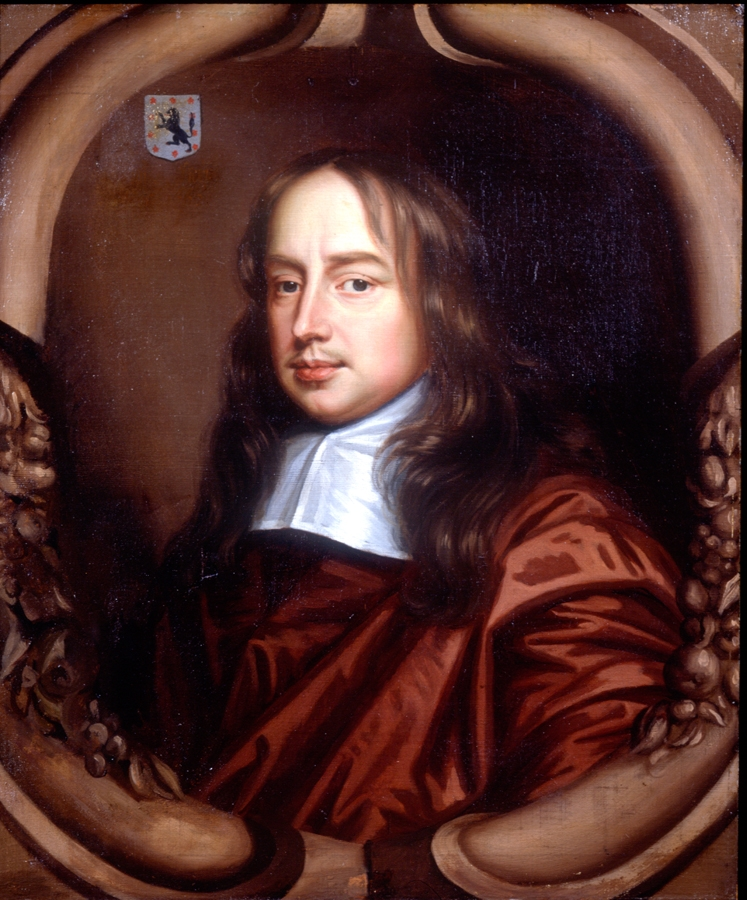
William Pierrepont.

William Pierrepont (c. 1607 – 17 July 1678) was an English politician who sat in the House of Commons at various times between 1640 and 1660. He supported the Parliamentary cause in the English Civil War.

== Life ==
Pierrepont was the second son of Robert Pierrepont, 1st Earl of Kingston-upon-Hull and his wife Gertrude Talbot, daughter of Hon. Henry Talbot of Burton Abbey, Yorkshire. He matriculated from Emmanuel College, Cambridge, in 1624 and was admitted at Lincoln's Inn on 1 April 1627. He was appointed Sheriff of Shropshire for 1638.

In April 1640, Pierrepont was elected Member of Parliament for Shropshire in the Short Parliament. He was elected MP for Great Wenlock in the Long Parliament in November 1640. He threw his influence on the side of peace and took part for the parliament in the negotiations with Charles I at Oxford in 1643. Pierrepont was a member of the committee of both kingdoms, and represented the parliamentary party during the deliberations at Uxbridge in 1645; but from that time, according to Clarendon, he forsook his moderate attitude, and contracted more bitterness and sourness than formerly. This statement, however, is perhaps somewhat exaggerated, as Pierrepont favored the resumption of negotiations with the king in 1647, and in the following year his efforts on behalf of peace at Newport, where again he represented the parliamentarians, brought upon him some slight censure from Cromwell.

For his services at Newport, he was thanked by Parliament; but he retired from active political life soon afterwards, as he disliked the purging of the House of Commons by Colonel Pride and the proceedings against the king. In spite of his moderate views Pierrepont enjoyed the personal friendship of Cromwell. He was elected MP for Nottinghamshire in 1654 for the First Protectorate Parliament. Although elected, he would not sit in the parliament of 1656, nor would he take the place offered to him in the Protector's House of Lords. When Richard Cromwell succeeded his father, Pierrepont was an unobtrusive but powerful influence in directing the policy of the government, and after a short period of retirement on Richard's fall he was chosen, early in 1660, a member of the council of state but refused to take his seat when secluded members were readmitted to the Restored Rump. He was elected MP for Nottinghamshire in the Convention Parliament of 1660, and probably was instrumental in saving the lives of some of the parliamentary leaders. At the general election of 1661, he was defeated and spent the remainder of his life in retirement. He died in 1678.

== Family ==
Pierrepont married Elizabeth, daughter of Sir Thomas Harries, Bart., of Tong Castle, Shropshire, by whom he had five sons and five daughters:

- Robert Pierrepont (died 1666), eldest son, was the father of Robert Pierrepont, 3rd Earl of Kingston-upon-Hull, William Pierrepont, 4th Earl of Kingston-upon-Hull, and Evelyn Pierrepont, 1st Duke of Kingston-upon-Hull;
- Gervase Pierrepont (1649 – 1715), third son, was created Baron Pierrepont in 1701, a title which became extinct on his death.
- Frances Pierrepont (b. 1 September 1630 in Thoresby, Nottinghamshire, d. 23 September 1695 in London), daughter, married Henry Cavendish, 2nd Duke of Newcastle, in 1652.
- Grace Pierrepont, daughter, married Gilbert Holles, 3rd Earl of Clare, on 9 July 1655.
- Gertrude Pierrepont, (b. 1641 – 1727), daughter, married George Savile, 1st Marquess of Halifax, in 1672.
