= Gervas Pierrepont, 6th Earl Manvers =

British hereditary peer, soldier and landowner

Arms of Pierrepont: Argent semée of cinquefoils gules, a lion rampant sable

Gervas Evelyn Pierrepont, 6th Earl Manvers, MC, JP (15 April 1881 – 13 February 1955), known as Gervas Pierrepont until 1940, was a British hereditary peer, soldier, landowner and member of the House of Lords.

== Early life and education ==
The eldest son of the Honourable Evelyn Henry Pierrepont, second son of Sydney Pierrepont, 3rd Earl Manvers, Pierrepont was educated at Winchester College and the Royal Indian Engineering College, Coopers Hill.

== Military service ==
Pierrepont served in the British Army, on the General List, in the First World War from 1914 to 1919, reaching the rank of Captain. He also served on the Claims Commission in Belgium from 1916–1917. He was decorated with the Military Cross, the Order of the Crown of Belgium, and the Croix de Guerre.

== Later life ==
After the First World War, Pierrepont served as a Justice of the Peace for the County of London. He represented Brixton as a Municipal Reform Party member of the London County Council from 1922 to 1946. He unsuccessfully contested Broxtowe as a Conservative in 1929.

In 1940 he succeeded his cousin Evelyn Robert Pierrepont, 5th Earl Manvers in the earldom and became a member of the House of Lords.

== Marriage & children ==
In 1918 Pierrepont married Marie-Louise Roosevelt Butterfield (1889–1984), daughter of Sir Frederick Butterfield of Cliffe Castle, Keighley. They had three children:

- Mary Helen Venetia Pierrepont (22 May 1920 - 21 February 1930)
- Evelyn Louis Butterfield Pierrepont (8 May 1924 - 29 September 1928)
- Lady Frederica Rozelle Ridgway Pierrepont (17 November 1925 - 22 June 2015). Lady Rozelle was an author under the pen name Rozelle Raynes. She married Major Alexander Montgomerie Greaves Beattie in 1953 (divorced 1961) and Richard Hollings Raynes in 1965. She inherited the Pierrepont estates on the death of her father.

Marie-Louise, Countess Manvers, was creating art under the name of Marie-Louise Pierrepont.

== Death ==
Lord Manvers died in February 1955 at the age of 73, when the earldom became extinct. A memorial to him is in the parish church at Perlethorpe.

Peerage of the United Kingdom
Preceded by Evelyn Robert Pierrepont	Earl Manvers; 1940–1955	Extinct
