= Henry Pierrepont, 1st Marquess of Dorchester =

17th-century English peer, Fellow of the Royal Society

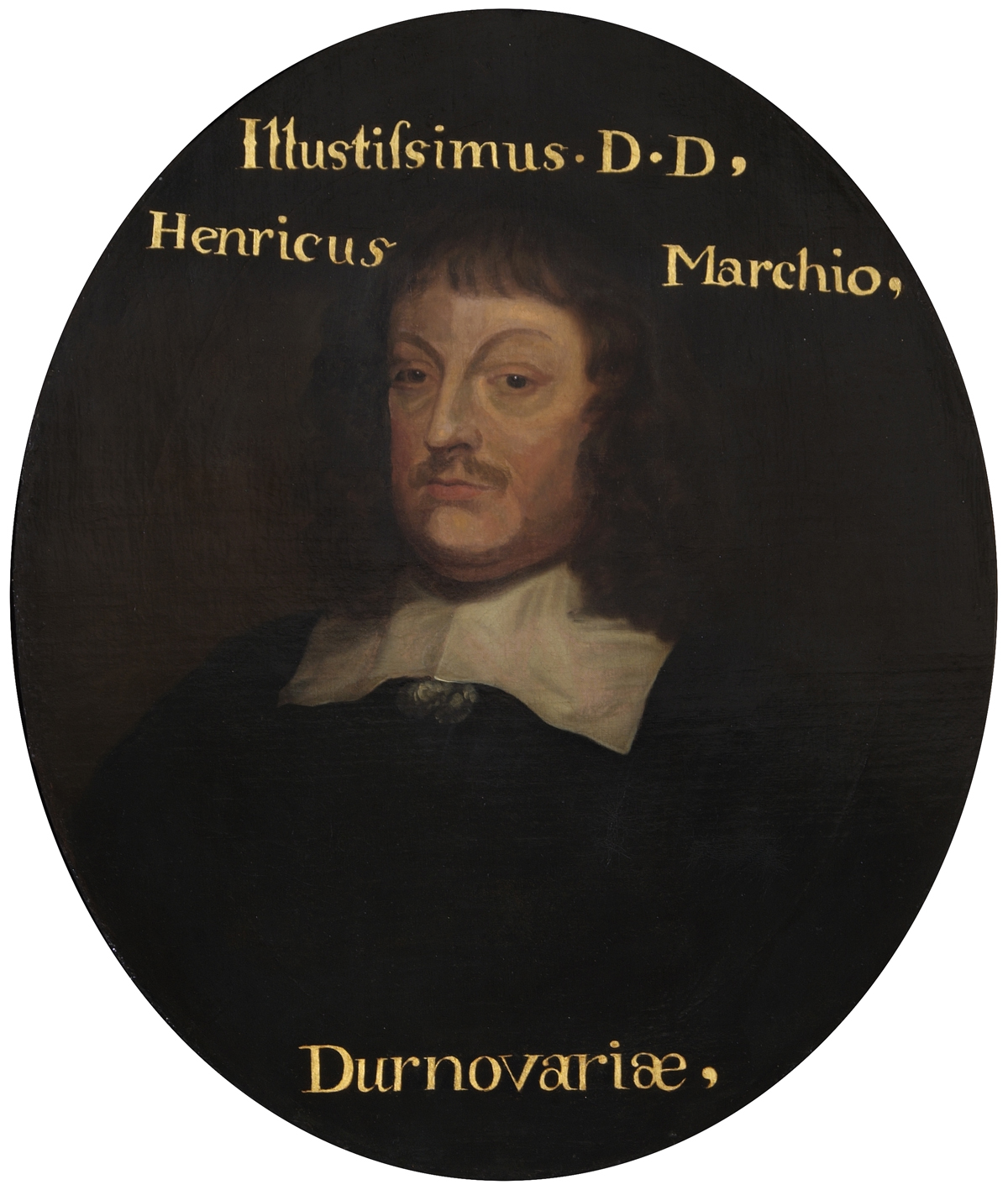

Earl of Kingston-upon-Hull
- Coat of arms
- Tenure: 1643-1680
- Predecessor: Robert Pierrepont, 1st Earl of Kingston-upon-Hull
- Successor: Robert Pierrepont, 3rd Earl of Kingston-upon-Hull
- Born: March 1606
- Died: 8 December 1680 (aged 74)
- Spouses: Cecilia Bayning (m. 1630; died 1639) Lady Catherine Stanley (died 1652)
- Issue: Lady Anne Pierrepont; Grace Pierrepont; Henry Pierrepont; Robert Pierrepont

Henry Pierrepont, 1st Marquess of Dorchester, PC, FRS, FRCP (March 1606 – 8 December 1680) was an English peer. He was the son of Robert Pierrepont, 1st Earl of Kingston-upon-Hull, and his wife, the former Gertrude Talbot, daughter of George Talbot and Elizabeth Reyner, and cousin of the Earl of Shrewsbury. He was born in Mansfield, Nottinghamshire.

== Career ==
Styled Viscount Newark from 1628, he was the Member of Parliament for Nottingham from 1628 until 1629, and was summoned to the House of Lords in his father's Barony of Pierrepont in 1641. He succeeded his father as 2nd Earl of Kingston-upon-Hull in 1643.

During the earlier part of the English Civil War, he was at Oxford in attendance upon the King, whom he represented at the negotiations at Uxbridge. In 1645, he was made a Privy Counsellor and created Marquess of Dorchester, but in 1647, he compounded for his estates by paying a large fine to the parliamentarians. Afterwards, Lord Dorchester, who was always fond of books, spent his time mainly in London engaged in the study of medicine and law, his devotion to the former science bringing upon him a certain amount of ridicule and abuse. His collection of books is now part of the library of the Royal College of Physicians.

In 1658, he was made a Fellow of the College of Physicians. During the Restoration, he remained politically active after being restored to the Privy Council on 27 August 1660. He later was made Recorder of Nottingham and a Fellow of the Royal Society.

== Personality ==
He was notorious for his bad temper and violent outbursts. He challenged his son-in-law, the future Duke of Rutland, to a duel in 1660; Dorchester blamed Rutland for the fact that his marriage to Dorchester's daughter Anne was notoriously unhappy. In 1638, he had to sue for a royal pardon for an assault on one Philip Kinder committed within the precincts of Westminster Abbey, during a religious service. In 1666, on a trivial pretext, he and George Villiers, 2nd Duke of Buckingham, came to blows in the Painted Chamber at Westminster during a Parliamentary conference. They were both imprisoned in the Tower of London for violating the dignity of Parliament, but were soon released after apologising.

== Marriages and children ==
He married first Cecilia Bayning, a daughter of Paul Bayning, 1st Viscount Bayning, and his wife Anne Glemham, daughter of Sir Henry Glemham. They had four children:

- Lady Anne Pierrepont (born 9 March 1630) married John Manners, future Duke of Rutland. In an unprecedented step, Manners was granted a divorce by an Act of Parliament in 1670.
- Grace Pierrepont
- Henry Pierrepont (died 1649)
- Robert Pierrepont

He was secondly married to Lady Catherine Stanley, a daughter of James Stanley, 7th Earl of Derby and Charlotte Stanley, Countess of Derby. This marriage was childless.

Dorchester survived his sons, and when he died in London on 8 December 1680, the Marquessate of Dorchester became extinct. He was succeeded as 3rd Earl of Kingston-upon-Hull by Robert (died 1682), a son of Robert Pierrepont of Thoresby, Nottinghamshire, and as 4th Earl by Robert's brother William (died 1690).

Parliament of England
Preceded by Sir Gervase Clifton; John Byron	Member of Parliament for Nottingham; 1628–1629; With: Sir Charles Cavendish	Parliament suspended until 1640
Peerage of England
New creation	Marquess of Dorchester; 1st creation 1645–1680	Extinct
Preceded by Robert Pierrepont	Earl of Kingston-upon-Hull; 1643–1680	Succeeded by Robert Pierrepont
Preceded by Robert Pierrepont	Baron Pierrepont (writ in acceleration); 1st creation 1641–1680	Succeeded by Robert Pierrepont
