= Henry Pierrepont (politician) =

English MP

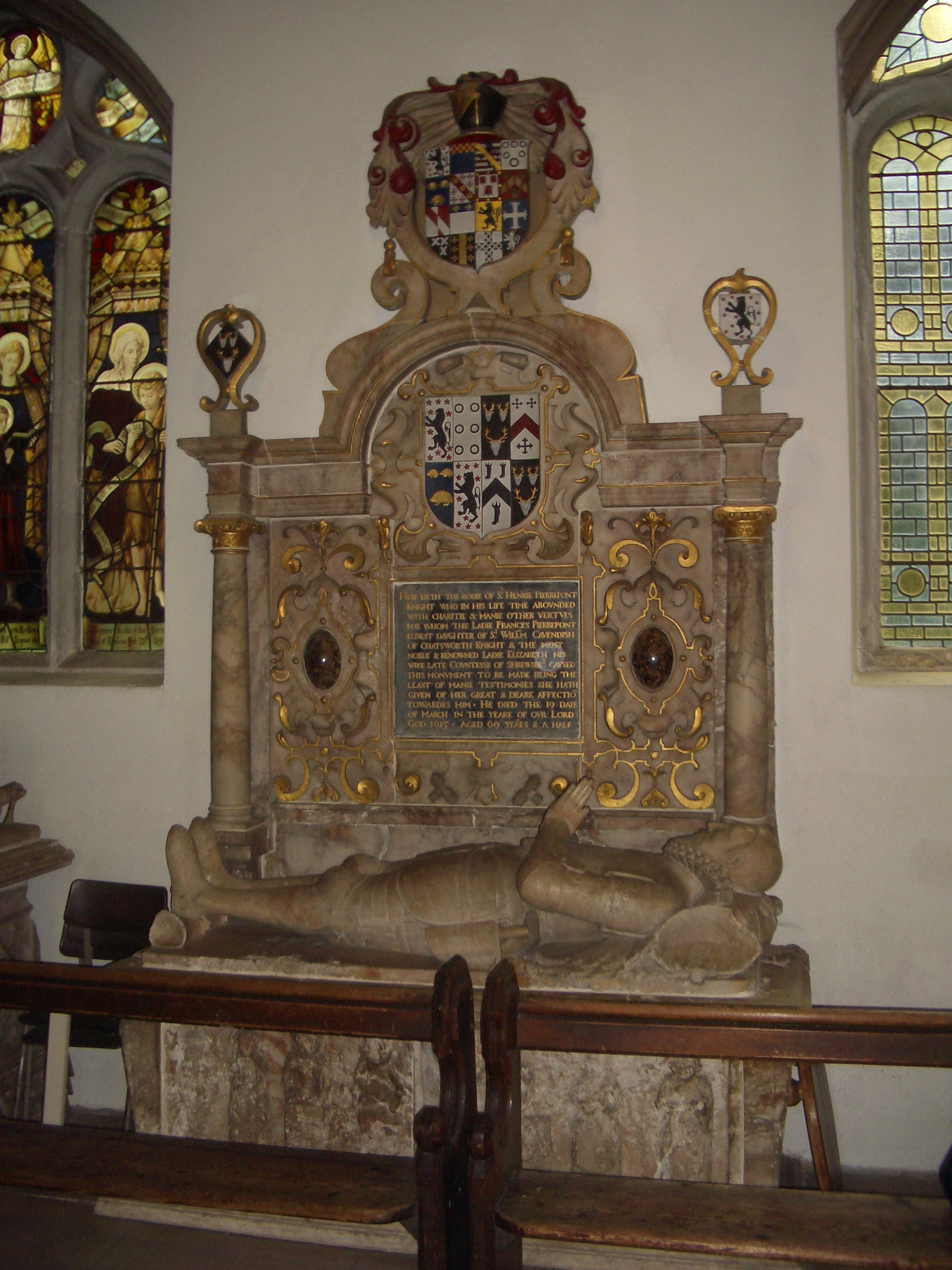
Memorial to Henry Pierrepont in St. Edmund's Church, Holme Pierrepont

Sir Henry Pierrepont (1546 – 19 March 1615) was an English MP who resided at Holme Pierrepont, Nottinghamshire.

== Family ==
He was the son of Sir George Pierrepont and his second wife Winifred, daughter of Sir William Thwaites of Manningtree, Essex. He succeeded his father in 1564 at the age of 17, his wardship being awarded to Roger Manners (died 1607). His mother subsequently married Sir Gervase Clifton as his second wife. He matriculated at Trinity Hall, Cambridge in 1561 and was admitted to Gray's Inn in 1564.

He married Frances Cavendish, daughter of the Rt. Hon. Sir William Cavendish and Elizabeth Hardwick. The children were:

- Grace Pierrepont
- Robert Pierrepont, 1st Earl of Kingston-upon-Hull
- Elizabeth Pierrepont, who was brought up in the household of Mary, Queen of Scots, and later married Thomas Erskine, 1st Earl of Kellie
- Mary Pierrepont

== Life ==
Despite his recusant mother and brother and despite suspicions about his own religious views, he was elected as member of parliament for Nottinghamshire in 1572 through the influence of his kinsman Edward Manners, 3rd Earl of Rutland. He became a justice of the peace for Nottinghamshire around 1573 and served as High Sheriff of Nottinghamshire in 1575–76. In 1580 his younger brother Gervase took Edmund Campion to spend Christmas at Holme Pierrepont. Following Campion's arrest, his house was searched and with his brother he was summoned before the privy council. Having made a confession before the Star Chamber they were released, but he was periodically suspended as a JP thereafter because of his religion. He served once more as sheriff in 1601–02, following the marriage of his heir to a niece of his wife's brother-in-law Gilbert Talbot, 7th Earl of Shrewsbury.

He was knighted by King James in April 1603 at Worksop Manor. Pierrepont succeeded Richard Parkins of Bunny, Nottinghamshire as Recorder of Nottingham in 1603.

== Memorial ==
His memorial, erected by his wife is in St. Edmund's Church, Holme Pierrepont.

== Sources ==
- The Complete Peerage of England, Scotland, Ireland, Great Britain and the United Kingdom, volume XI.
