= Evelyn Pierrepont, 2nd Duke of Kingston-upon-Hull =

British Army officer and landowner (1711–1773)

General His Grace The Duke of Kingston-upon-Hull KG
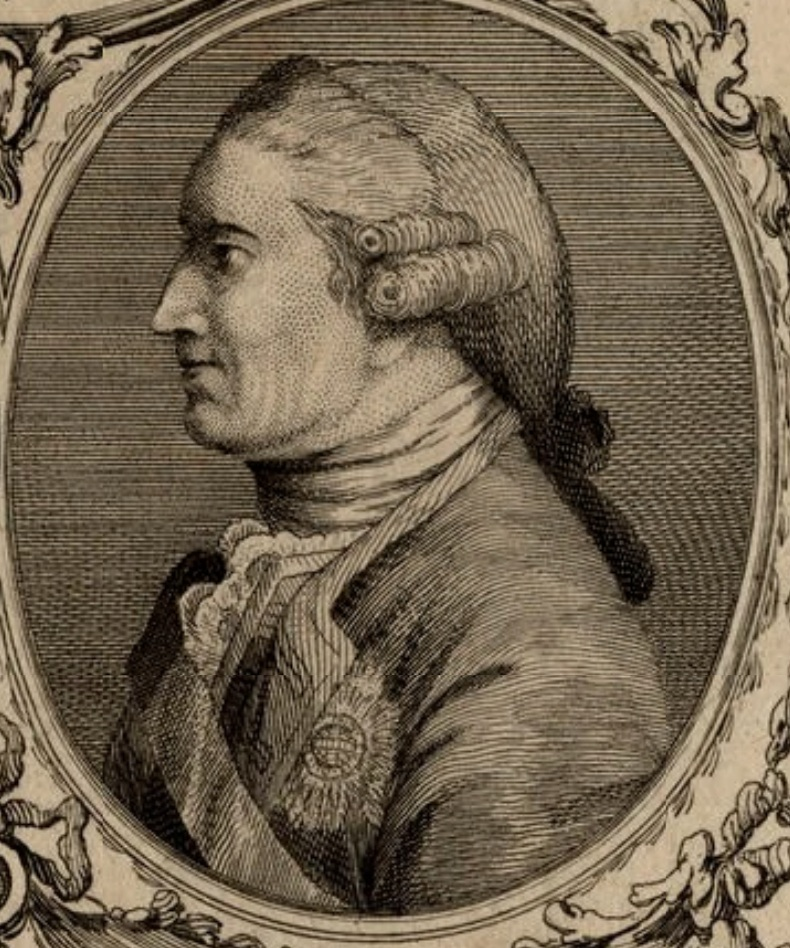
- 1775 portrait

Lord Lieutenant of Nottinghamshire
- In office 1763–1765
- Preceded by: The Duke of Newcastle-upon-Tyne
- Succeeded by: The Duke of Newcastle-upon-Tyne

Personal details
- Born: 1711
- Died: 23 September 1773 (aged 61–62) Holme Pierrepont Hall
- Spouse: Elizabeth Hervey (m. 1769; died 1773)
- Parent(s): William Pierrepont, Earl of Kingston-upon-Hull; Rachel Bayntun
- Relatives: Evelyn Pierrepont, 1st Duke of Kingston-upon-Hull (grandfather)
- Education: Eton College

Military service
- Allegiance: Great Britain
- Branch/service: British Army
- Years of service: 1745–1773
- Rank: General
- Unit: Duke of Kingston's Regiment of Light Horse
- Battles/wars: Battle of Culloden

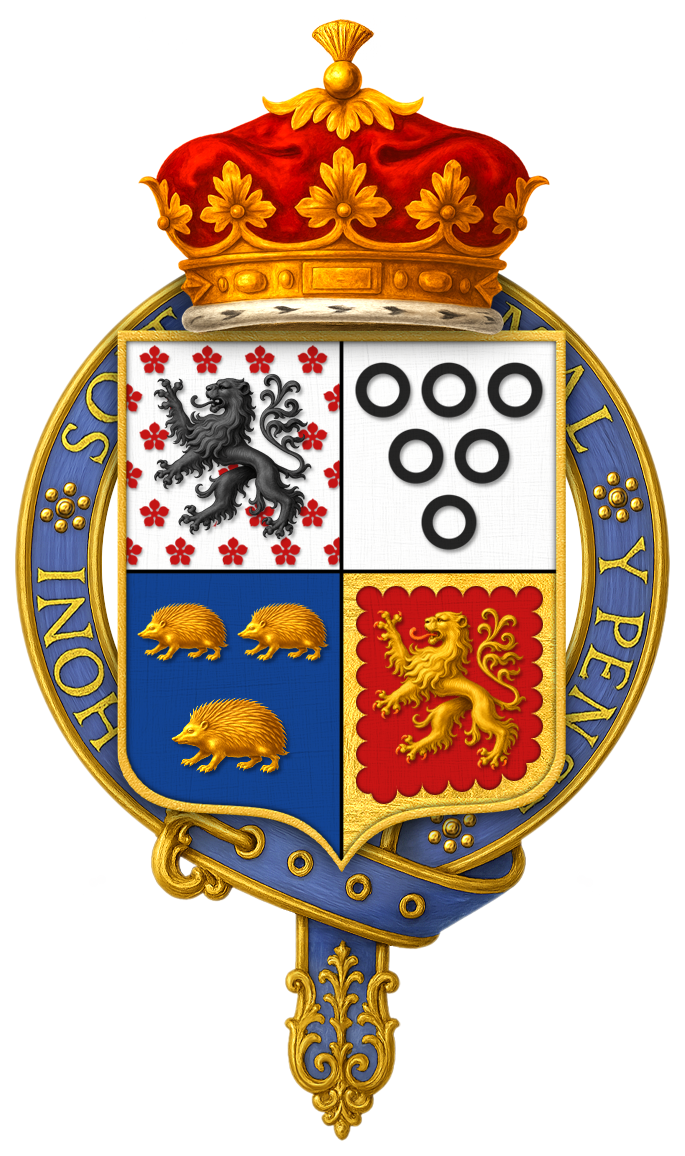
Quartered coat of arms of Evelyn Pierrepont, 2nd Duke of Kingston-upon-Hull, KG

General Evelyn Pierrepont, 2nd Duke of Kingston-upon-Hull, KG (1711 – 23 September 1773) was a British Army officer and landowner.

== Early life ==
He was the only son of William Pierrepont, Earl of Kingston-upon-Hull (1692–1713) and his wife, Rachel Bayntun (1695–1722).

His paternal grandparents were Evelyn Pierrepont, 1st Duke of Kingston-upon-Hull and his wife Mary Feilding, a daughter of William Feilding, 3rd Earl of Denbigh, while his maternal grandparents were Elizabeth Willoughby and her husband Thomas Bayntun of Little Chalfield, Wiltshire, or else her lover John Hall of Bradford-on-Avon. He succeeded his grandfather in 1726, inheriting the Thoresby estate in Nottinghamshire.

== Career ==
Pierrepont studied at Eton College in 1725, and the following year went on the Grand Tour, spending ten years on the Continent and becoming known for gambling and loose living. In 1736 he returned to England with his mistress, Marie-Thérèse de Fontaine de la Touche, who became a British subject, and who remained with him until 1750. The duke had little interest in politics and did not take any part in governmental affairs.

=== Military career ===
When the Jacobite rising of 1745 broke out he raised the Duke of Kingston's Regiment of Light Horse, a light cavalry regiment which distinguished itself at the Battle of Culloden. The duke attained the rank of general in the army. He was described by Horace Walpole as "a very weak man, of the greatest beauty and finest person in England".

Pierrepont was the subject of the earliest extant reference to cricket in Nottinghamshire. A letter dated 1751 comments that: "the Duke of Kingston at Thoresby Hall is spending all his time practising cricket because he is to play for Eton v All England in three matches".

== Personal life ==
On 8 March 1769, Pierrepont married Elizabeth Hervey at Keith's Chapel in the parish of St George's, Hanover Square, Westminster, although their marriage was later judged to have been bigamous.

Lord Kingston died in 1773 without issue, and his titles became extinct. On the death of the bigamous Duchess in 1788, the Pierrepont estates passed to Charles Medows, who was the son of the 2nd Duke's sister, Lady Frances Medows. Charles Medows changed his name to Pierrepont in 1796 and, in 1806, he was created the first Earl Manvers.

Political offices
Preceded by New office	Master of the Staghounds; 1738–1744	Succeeded by Lord Robert Manners-Sutton
Military offices
Preceded by Regiment raised	Colonel of the Duke of Kingston's Regiment of Horse; 1745–1746	Succeeded by Regiment disbanded
Honorary titles
Preceded by The Duke of Newcastle-upon-Tyne	Lord Lieutenant of Nottinghamshire; 1763–1765	Succeeded by The Duke of Newcastle-upon-Tyne
Peerage of Great Britain
Preceded by Evelyn Pierrepont	Duke of Kingston-upon-Hull; 1726–1773	Extinct
Peerage of England
Preceded by Evelyn Pierrepont	Marquess of Dorchester; 1726–1773	Extinct
