= Evelyn Pierrepont, 1st Duke of Kingston-upon-Hull =

British politician (1665–1726)

His Grace The Duke of Kingston-upon-Hull KG PC
- Portrait by Sir Godfrey Kneller, 1709

Lord President of the Council
- In office 6 February 1719 – 11 June 1720
- Monarch: George I
- Preceded by: The Earl of Sunderland
- Succeeded by: Viscount Townshend

Personal details
- Born: 1665
- Died: 5 March 1726 (aged 60–61)
- Spouse(s): Lady Mary Feilding; Lady Isabella Bentinck
- Children: 6, including Mary

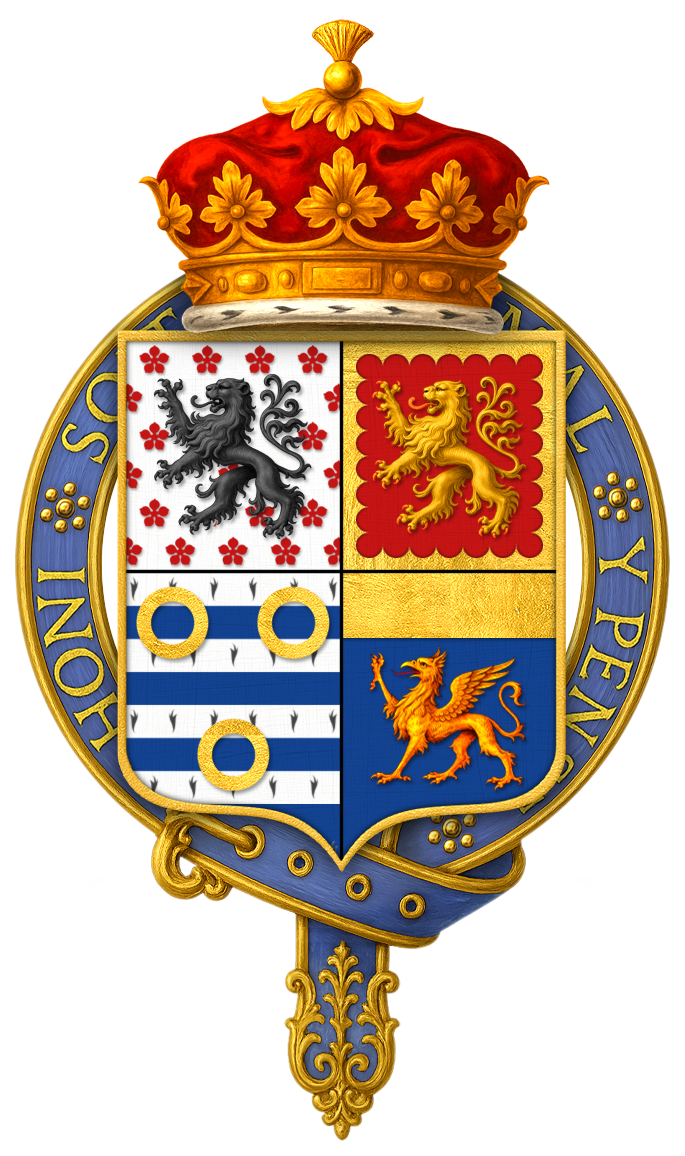
Quartered coat of arms of Evelyn Pierrepont, 1st Duke of Kingston-upon-Hull, KG

Evelyn Pierrepont, 1st Duke of Kingston-upon-Hull, KG, PC (c. 1665 – 5 March 1726) was a British politician.

He was born at West Dean, Wiltshire, the third son of Robert Pierrepont of Thoresby, Nottinghamshire (son of William Pierrepont MP), and his wife Elizabeth Evelyn (daughter of John Evelyn MP). His older brothers were the 3rd Earl and 4th Earl of Kingston-upon-Hull, who both died childless.

He was educated at Winchester College, and entered Christ's College, Cambridge in 1683.

== Political career ==
He was elected member of parliament for East Retford in 1689, before his accession to the peerage as 5th Earl of Kingston-upon-Hull on the death of his brother in 1690. While serving as one of the commissioners for the union with Scotland, he was created Marquess of Dorchester in 1706, and took a leading part in the business of the House of Lords. He was made a privy councillor and in 1715 was created Duke of Kingston-upon-Hull; afterwards serving as Lord Privy Seal and Lord President of the Council. The Duke was a prominent figure in the fashionable society of his day.

== Family ==
His first wife was Lady Mary Feilding, a daughter of William Feilding, 3rd Earl of Denbigh, and his wife Mary King, whom he married in 1687. They had three daughters and a son:

- Lady Mary Pierrepont (died 1762), who married the diplomat Edward Wortley Montagu
- Lady Frances Pierrepont (died 1761), who married John Erskine, Earl of Mar
- Lady Evelyn Pierrepont (died 1727), who married John Leveson-Gower, 1st Earl Gower, and was the mother of Gertrude Russell, Duchess of Bedford
- William Pierrepont, Earl of Kingston-upon-Hull, who died of smallpox, aged 20, in July 1713. He married Rachel Baynton, seemingly a daughter of Thomas Baynton of Little Chalfield, Wiltshire, but heiress and biological daughter of John Hall of Bradford-on-Avon, Wiltshire, and had a daughter Frances (died 1795) and a son Evelyn.

His second wife was Lady Isabella Bentinck, daughter of Hans William Bentinck, 1st Earl of Portland, whom he married in 1714. They had two daughters:

- Lady Caroline Pierrepont (died 1753), who married Thomas Brand MP.
- Lady Anne Pierrepont (1719–1739)

He was succeeded by his grandson Evelyn, son of William.

Honorary titles
Preceded by The Viscount Weymouth	Custos Rotulorum of Wiltshire; 1706–1711	Succeeded by The Viscount Weymouth
Preceded by The Viscount Weymouth	Custos Rotulorum of Wiltshire; 1714–1726	Succeeded by Earl of Hertford
Parliament of England
Preceded by Sir Edward Nevill; John Millington	Member of Parliament for East Retford; 1689–1690; With: John Thornhagh	Succeeded by John Thornhagh; Richard Taylor
Legal offices
Preceded by The Duke of Leeds	Justice in Eyre north of the Trent; 1714–1717	Succeeded by The Earl of Westmorland
Political offices
Preceded by The Earl of Sunderland	Lord Privy Seal; 1716–1719	Succeeded by The Duke of Kent
Preceded by The Earl of Sunderland	Lord President of the Council; 1719–1720	Succeeded by The Viscount Townshend
Preceded by The Duke of Kent	Lord Privy Seal; 1720–1726	Succeeded by The Lord Trevor
Peerage of Great Britain
New creation	Duke of Kingston-upon-Hull; 1715–1726	Succeeded by Evelyn Pierrepont
Peerage of England
New creation	Marquess of Dorchester; 2nd creation 1706–1726	Succeeded by Evelyn Pierrepont
Preceded by William Pierrepont	Earl of Kingston-upon-Hull; 1690–1726	Succeeded by Evelyn Pierrepont
