= Robert Pierrepont, 1st Earl of Kingston-upon-Hull =

English noble and royalist

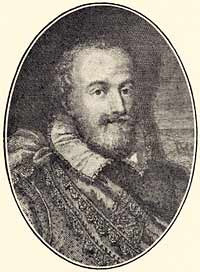

Earl of Kingston-upon-Hull
- Reign: 1628–1643
- Predecessor: Newly created
- Successor: Henry Pierrepont
- Born: August 6, 1584
- Died: July 25, 1643 (aged 58); Gainsborough, Lincolnshire, England
- Spouse: Gertrude Talbot (m. 1601)
- Issue: Henry Pierrepont, 1st Marquess of Dorchester; Francis Pierrepont; William Pierrepont; Lady Frances Pierrepont
- Father: Sir Henry Pierrepont
- Mother: Frances Cavendish

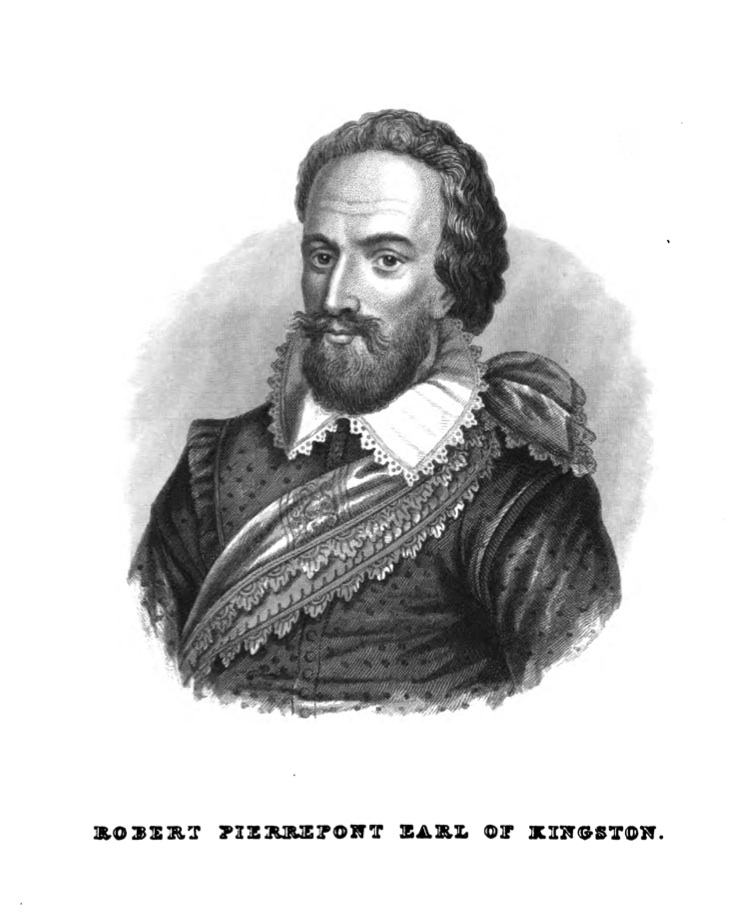
From Bailey's Annals of Nottinghamshire, 1853

Robert Pierrepont, 1st Earl of Kingston-upon-Hull (6 August 1584 – 25 July 1643) was an English nobleman who joined the Royalist side in the English Civil War after some delay and became lieutenant-general of the counties of Lincoln, Rutland, Huntingdon, Cambridge and Norfolk. He was killed in a friendly fire incident after being captured by Parliamentary forces.

== Early life ==
Pierrepont was the second son of Sir Henry Pierrepont of Holme Pierrepont, Nottinghamshire, and his wife Frances Cavendish, a daughter of Sir William Cavendish and Bess of Hardwick. His sister became Grace, Lady Manners, of Haddon Hall.

In 1596 he became an undergraduate of Oriel College, Oxford, and was later a benefactor in the rebuilding of the college's Front Quad.

== Career ==
Pierrepont was one of the two Members of Parliament for Nottinghamshire in 1601. He became a JP for Nottinghamshire in 1608 and was appointed High Sheriff of Nottinghamshire in 1615. He was created Baron Pierrepont and Viscount Newark in 1627 and Earl of Kingston-upon-Hull the following year.

In 1633 he bought Thoresby Park.

Pierrepont remained neutral on the outbreak of the Civil War, declaring, in what was later taken to be a prophetic curse:

When… I take arms with the King against Parliament, or with the Parliament against the King, let a cannon-ball divide me between them.

He eventually became a Royalist, joining King Charles, and was appointed lieutenant-general of royal forces in the counties of Lincoln, Rutland, Huntingdon, Cambridge and Norfolk.

Whilst defending Gainsborough he was taken prisoner, and was killed on 25 July 1643, aged 58, while being conveyed to Hull by boat along the River Trent. Royalist forces fired at his captors from the river bank, accidentally killing the Earl whose body was cut in two by a cannonball.

== Personal life ==
Pierrepont married Gertrude Talbot, a daughter of Henry Talbot (1554–1596), a younger son of George Talbot, 6th Earl of Shrewsbury, and Elizabeth Reyner (born 1556) on 8 January 1601 in Overton Longueville, Huntingdonshire.

Pierrepont had five sons, the eldest of whom was his heir Henry Pierrepont, later created first Marquess of Dorchester. Other sons included Francis Pierrepont (died 1659), a colonel in the parliamentary army and afterwards a member of the Long Parliament, and William Pierrepont (1608–1679), father-in-law of Gilbert Holles, 3rd Earl of Clare, and of Henry Cavendish, 2nd Duke of Newcastle.

Pierrepont's daughter Lady Frances (born 1615) married Philip Rolleston, Esquire.

He was succeeded in his peerage by his son Henry, who built the first Thoresby Hall in 1670. The author Frances Catherine Barnard was a descendant.

== Arms ==
Arms of Pierrepont: Argent semée of cinquefoils gules, a lion rampant sable

Peerage of England
New creation	Earl of Kingston-upon-Hull; 1628–1643	Succeeded by Henry Pierrepont
New creation	Viscount Newark; 1st creation 1627–1643	Succeeded by Henry Pierrepont
New creation	Baron Pierrepont (descended by acceleration); 1st creation 1627–1641	Succeeded by Henry Pierrepont
