= William Pierrepont, 4th Earl of Kingston-upon-Hull =

British peer and Member of Parliament

Arms of Pierrepont: Argent semée of cinquefoils gules, a lion rampant sable

William Pierrepont, 4th Earl of Kingston-upon-Hull (c. 1662 – 17 September 1690) was an English peer and Member of Parliament.

The second son of Robert Pierrepont of Thoresby Nottinghamshire and his wife Elizabeth Evelyn, Pierrepont was born on the Evelyn estate of West Dean, Wiltshire. He was educated at Trinity College, Oxford.

He inherited the Earldom of Kingston-upon-Hull in June 1682 from his elder brother Robert Pierrepont, 3rd Earl of Kingston-upon-Hull.

In 1689 and 1690 he acted as Colonel of a Regiment of Foot, Lord Lieutenant of Nottinghamshire and Lord Lieutenant of the East Riding of Yorkshire, Chief Justice in Eyre North of the Trent, and High Steward of Kingston-upon-Hull.

He died in 1690 of apoplexy at Holme Pierrepont, and was succeeded as 5th Earl by his younger brother Evelyn Pierrepont.

Legal offices
Preceded by The 2nd Duke of Newcastle-upon-Tyne	Justice in Eyre north of the Trent; 1689–1690	Succeeded by The Earl of Devonshire
Honorary titles
Preceded by The 2nd Duke of Newcastle-upon-Tyne	Lord Lieutenant of Nottinghamshire; 1689–1690	Vacant Title next held by The Duke of Devonshire
Preceded by The 2nd Duke of Newcastle-upon-Tyne	Custos Rotulorum of Nottinghamshire; 1689–1690	Vacant Title next held by The 1st Duke of Newcastle-upon-Tyne
Preceded by The 2nd Duke of Newcastle-upon-Tyne	Lord Lieutenant of the East Riding of Yorkshire; 1689–1690	Vacant Title next held by The Marquess of Carmarthen
Peerage of England
Preceded by Robert Pierrepont	Earl of Kingston-upon-Hull; 1682–1690	Succeeded by Evelyn Pierrepont
