= Robert Pierrepont, 3rd Earl of Kingston-upon-Hull =

English peer (c. 1660–1682)

Arms of Pierrepont: Argent semée of cinquefoils gules, a lion rampant sable

Robert Pierrepont, 3rd Earl of Kingston-upon-Hull (c. 1660 – June 1682) was an English peer.

The eldest son of Robert Pierrepont of Thoresby, Nottinghamshire, and his wife Elizabeth Evelyn, and the grandson of William Pierrepont of Thoresby, in 1680, he succeeded his great-uncle, Henry Pierrepont, 1st Marquess of Dorchester, as Earl of Kingston-upon-Hull. He died unmarried at Dieppe in 1682 and was succeeded in the earldom by his brother William Pierrepont, 4th Earl of Kingston-upon-Hull.

Peerage of England
Preceded by Henry Pierrepont	Earl of Kingston-upon-Hull; 1680–1682	Succeeded by William Pierrepont
