= Buchanan baronets of Dunburgh (1878) =

The Buchanan baronetcy, of Dunburgh in the County of Stirling, was created in the Baronetage of the United Kingdom on 14 December 1878 for the diplomat Sir Andrew Buchanan, GCB. He was British Ambassador to Russia in 1864 and to Austria in 1871.

His eldest son, the 2nd Baronet, died childless in 1901, and was succeeded by his younger brother, the 3rd Baronet. His son, the 4th Baronet, served with the North Russian Relief Force in 1919. He was a Justice of the Peace, Deputy Lieutenant and High Sheriff of Nottinghamshire in 1962. The 5th Baronet, who succeeded in 1984, was Lord-Lieutenant of Nottinghamshire from 1991 to 2012.

== Buchanan baronets, of Dunburgh (1878) ==
- Sir Andrew Buchanan, 1st Baronet, GCB (1807–1882)
- Sir James Buchanan, 2nd Baronet (1840–1901)
- Sir Eric Alexander Buchanan, 3rd Baronet (1848–1928)
- Sir Charles James Buchanan, 4th Baronet (1899–1984)
- Sir Andrew George Buchanan, 5th Baronet, KCVO (born 1937)

The heir apparent is the present holder's son George Charles Mellish Buchanan (born 1975).

== Extended family ==
Sir George Buchanan, fourth son of the 1st Baronet, was also a diplomat, ambassador at Petrograd from 1910 to 1918.

Coat of arms of Buchanan baronets of Dunburgh
| Crest An armed dexter hand holding a cap of dignity Purpure facing Ermine. Escutcheon Or a lion rampant Sable between two otters' heads erased in chief Proper and a cinquefoil in base of the second all within the Royal tressure of the last. Supporters Dexter a falcon wings elevated and addorsed Proper belled beaked and charged on the breast with two branches of laurel conjoined Or sinister a gryphon Sable charged in like manner with two branches of laurel. Motto Nunquam Victus |

== Notes ==
Baronetage of the United Kingdom
| Preceded by Milne baronets | Buchanan baronets of Dunburgh; 14 December 1878 | Succeeded by Mowbray baronets |
