= Admiral Milne =

Admiral Milne may refer to:

- Sir Alexander Milne, 1st Baronet (1806–1896), British Royal Navy admiral
- Berkeley Milne (1855–1938), British Royal Navy admiral
- David Milne (Royal Navy officer) (1763–1845), Scottish-born British Royal Navy admiral
