= High Sheriff of Nottinghamshire =

Ceremonial officer of the English county of Nottinghamshire

High Sheriffs of Nottinghamshire
- Coat of arms of Nottinghamshire

- Incumbent; Merlita Bryan since 2026
- Nottinghamshire County Council
- Style: High Sheriff
- Status: Current High Sheriff
- Member of: Nottinghamshire Council
- Residence: Nottinghamshire
- Seat: Nottinghamshire Council
- Nominator: Political parties
- Appointer: Nottinghamshire County Council; Lord Lieutenant of Nottinghamshire
- Term length: no set term
- Formation: 1568
- Deputy: Lord Mayor
- Website: http://www.nottinghamshire.gov.uk

This is a list of the High Sheriffs of the English county of Nottinghamshire.

The High Sheriff is the oldest secular office under the Crown. Formerly the High Sheriff was the principal law enforcement officer in the county but over the centuries most of the responsibilities associated with the post have been transferred elsewhere or are now defunct, so its functions are now largely ceremonial. The High Sheriff changes every March.

From 1068 until 1567, the position existed as High Sheriff of Nottinghamshire, Derbyshire and the Royal Forests. From 1568 separate appointments were made for the High Sheriff of Nottinghamshire and for the High Sheriff of Derbyshire.

== 16th century ==
- For Sheriffs prior to 1568 see High Sheriff of Nottinghamshire, Derbyshire and the Royal Forests
- 1567: Sir Anthony Strelley
- 1568: Thomas Cowper
- 1569: John Byron
- 1570: John Nevill
- 1571: Robert Markham
- 1572: Sir Gervase Clifton (4th term)
- 1573: William Holles of Haughton
- 1574: Sir Thomas Stanhope of Shelford
- 1575: Henry Pierrepont of Holme Pierrepont
- 1576: George Chaworth of Wiverton
- 1577: Thomas Markham of Ollerton
- 1578: John Biron of Newstead Abbey
- 1579: Sir Francis Willoughby of Wollaton Hall (1st term)
- 1580: George Nevill
- 1581: William Sutton of Arundel
- 1582: Francis Molyneux of Teversal Manor
- 1583: Robert Markham
- 1584: Brian Lassels
- 1585: John Sydenham
- 1586: George Chaworth
- 1587: Sir Thomas Stanhope of Shelford
- 1588: Sir Francis Willoughby of Wollaton Hall (2nd term)
- 1589: John Byron
- 1590: Thomas Thornhough
- 1591: John Holles, 1st Earl of Clare of Haughton
- 1592: John Basset
- 1593: Sir Francis Willoughby of Wollaton Hall (3rd term)
- 1594: William Sutton
- 1595: Richard Whalley of Kirton and Screveton
- 1596: John Biron of Newstead Abbey
- 1597: John Thorold
- 1598: Henry Chaworth
- 1599: Brian Lassels

== 17th century ==
- 1600: Edward North
- 1601: Henry Pierrepont of Holme Pierrepont, Notts.
- 1602: Roger Ascough
- 1603: William Rayner
- 1604: Gabriel Armstrong
- 1605: William Sutton
- 1606: William Cowper
- 1607: John Thornhagh
- 1608: Henry Sacheverell of Rockley
- 1609: John Molyneux of Teversal Manor
- 1610: Sir Gervase Clifton, 1st Baronet of Clifton Hall, Nottingham
- 1611: Sir John Molyneux Bt of Teversal Manor
- 1612: John Byron
- 1613: Sir George Parkins of Bunny Hall
- 1614: Robert Williamson of East Markham
- 1615: Robert Pierrepont, 1st Earl of Kingston-upon-Hull
- 1616: George Lassels
- 1617: Sir John Thornhagh of Fenton Hall
- 1618: Thomas Barton
- 1619: William Reason
- 1620: Thomas Hutchinson of Owthorpe and Nottingham
- 1621: Sir John White, Knt. of Tuxford.
- 1622: John Digby
- 1623: Sir Matthew Palmer of Southwell
- 1624: Edward Golding and Geoffrey Markham
- 1625: Timothy Pusey
- 1626: Francis Williamson
- 1627: Sir Thomas Hewet of Shireoaks Hall
- 1628: Gervase Tovery
- 1629: Thomas Perkins
- 1630: Robert Sutton
- 1631: Thomas White
- 1632: Thomas Rolles
- 1633: Robert Mellish of Ragnall
- 1634: John Byron, 1st Baron Byron of Rochdale
- 1635: Sir Hardolph Wasteneys, 1st Baronet of Hendon
- 1636: George Lassels
- 1637: Francis Thornhagh of Fenton Hall
- 1638: George Chaworth, 1st Viscount Chaworth of Armagh (died in office and replaced by son John)
- 1639: Thomas Williamson
- 1640: Gilbert and Edward Nevill
- 1642: Sir John Digby
- 1643: Francis Thornhagh
- 1645: Gabriel Armstrong
- 1646: Richard (or Nicholas) Hacker of Flyntham
- 1647: Henry Sacheverell
- 1648: Francis Molyneux
- 1649: William Clarkson
- 1650: Robert Reynes
- 1651: William Childers
- 1652: Bryan Broughton
- 10 November 1653: Symon Bennett
- 21 November 1653: Sir Hardolph Wasteneys, 2nd Baronet
- 23 November 1653: Sir William Hickman, 2nd Baronet
- 1654: John Musters
- 1655: William Willoughby
- 1657: Hon Anchitell Grey of Risley
- 1658–Feb 1660: John Hutchinson
- 1659: John Ragner
- 1660: Sir Francis Leke, 1st Baronet
- 1661: Francis Molyneux of Mansfield
- 1662: Roland Sandes
- 1663: Humphrey Monoux
- 1664: Acton Burnell
- 12 November 1665: John White, of Cotgrave
- 7 November 1666: George Gregory
- 6 November 1667: Thomas Charleton
- 6 November 1668: Gervais Pigott
- 11 November 1669: Sir Francis Rodes, 3rd Baronet
- 24 November 1669: Thomas Lewes
- 4 November 1670: Sir Francis Rodes, 3rd Baronet
- 9 November 1671: Thomas Perkins
- 11 November 1672: Richard Lloyd
- 12 November 1673: John Hacker of Flintham
- 5 November 1674: Edward (or John) Finney of Skegby
- 15 November 1675: William Pinkney
- 10 November 1676: Richard Slater of Nuthall
- 15 November 1677: Henry Plumtree
- 14 November 1678: John Linley, of Skegby
- 13 November 1679: Arthur Warren
- 4 November 1680: Charles Lacock
- 1682: Lancelot Rolleston of Watnall Hall
- 1683: Francis Sandys
- 1684: Sir Matthew Jenison of Newark In 2022, a former gold signet ring of Jenison with links to the position of High Sheriff of Nottingham sold for £8,500 at auction.
- 1685: John Digby
- 1686: Thomas Hewitt replaced by Edmund Nicholson
- 1687: Darcy Molyneux of Mansfield
- 1688: George Willoughby
- 1689: John Dand
- 18 March 1689: Sir Thomas Parkyns, 2nd Baronet
- 18 November 1689: Richard Taylor of Wallingwells Hall
- 27 November 1690: Sir Nathaniel Curzon, 2nd Baronet
- 14 December 1691: William Brownlow, of Marlam
- 21 December 1691: Edward Mellish of Blyth Hall
- 17 November 1692: William Simpson
- 30 November 1693: Thomas Newdigate
- December? 1693: George Gregory of Lenton
- 6 December 1694: John Clerkson
- 5 December 1695: Sir Thomas Willoughby, 1st Baronet of Wollaton Hall
- 17 December 1696: Gervase Eyre
- 16 December 1697: Timothy Ellis
- 6 January 1699: Robert Porter

== 18th century ==
- 1700: Richard Brunt replaced by Robert Hacker
- 1701: John Harbord
- 1702: William Burnett
- 1703: Samuel Brant
- 1704: Borlase Warren of Stapleford
- 1705: Patrick Chaworth
- 1706: Mundy Musters of Colwick Hall
- 1707: Sir George Savile, 7th Baronet of Rufford Abbey
- 1708: William Levinz of Grove Hall and Bilby, Notts.
- 1709: Richard Edge
- 1710: John Simpson of Babworth Hall
- 1711: Jonathan Acklam
- 1712: John Molyneux of Terversal Manor
- 1713: Francis Lewis of Stanford Hall, Nottinghamshire
- 1714: George Sharp
- 1715: John Collins
- 1716: Julius Hutchinson
- 1717: Joseph Mellish of Blyth
- 1718: Isaac Knight
- 1719: Lyonel Copley
- 1720: William Hallowes
- 1721: John Sherwin
- 1722: John Emerton
- 1722: John Grundy
- 1723: James Bancks
- 1724: John Shaw of Brinley upon the Hill
- 1725: George Langford
- 1726: Beilby Thomson
- 1727: Richard Browne of Gulthorpe
- 1728: Anthony Eyre
- 1729: Samuel Peak
- 1730: William Shipman
- 1731: John Nevill
- 1732: John Neal
- 1733: John Disney of Lincoln
- 1734: Thomas Porter
- 1735: Thomas Lister
- 1736: Acton Burnell of Winckborne replaced by William Burnell
- 1737: William Challand
- 1738: Joseph Clay of Nottingham
- 1739: John Gilbert Cooper of Thurgarton
- 1740: John Storey the younger
- 1741: Thomas Langford
- 1742: William Cartwright of Sutton
- 1743: Lancelot Rolleston
- 1744: Richard Browne of Gunthorpe
- 1745: Henry Donstan of Worksop
- 1746: John Thornhaugh
- 1747: Sir Charles Molyneux, 5th Baronet of Teversal Manor
- 1748: Thomas Stowe
- 1749: William Chaworth of Aunsley
- 1750: William Westcombe of Thrumpton
- 1751: John Borlase Warren
- 1752: Darcy Burnell of Winkbourn
- 1753: Mundy Musters of Colwick Hall
- 1754: Jonathan Acklom of Wiseton
- 1755: Sir Thomas Parkyns, Bt of Bunny
- 1756: Robert Sutton of Retford
- 1757: John Hall of Mansfield Woodhouse
- 1758: Sir George Smith, 1st Baronet of East Stoke
- 1759: John Whetham of Kirklington
- 1760: Ralph Edge of Strelley
- 1761: Sir Samuel Gordon, 1st Baronet of Newark-upon-Trent
- 1762: John Newton
- 1763: David Gash of Balderton
- 1764: Charles Mellish of Ragnall
- 1765: William Ellis of Thornton
- 1766: John Bell of Colston Bassett
- 1767: Sir Gervase Clifton, 6th Baronet, of Clifton Hall, Nottingham
- 1768: John Bell of Colton Bassett
- 1769: Robert Foster of Newark
- 1770: Urban Hall of Mansfield Woodhouse
- 1771: George Dunston of Worksop
- 1772: George Neville of Thorney
- 1773: John Emmerton Wescomb Emmerton of Thrumpton
- 1774: Joseph Pocklington of Carlton-upon-Trent
- 1775: Cornelius Launder
- 1776: Abel Smith the Younger of Bulcote
- 1777: John Musters of Colwick Hall
- 1778: William Bilbie of Berry Hill
- 1779: William Denison of Ossington
- 1780: Charles Vere Dashwood of Stanford Hall
- 1781: Lancelot Rolleston of Watnall
- 1782: John Litchfield of Mansfield
- 1783: John Gilbert Cooper of Thurgaton
- 1784: Pendock Neal
- 1785: Sherbrooke Lowe, of Southwell
- 1786: Anthony Hartshorne of Hayton
- 1787: Thomas Waterhouse of Beckenham
- 1788: Richard Stenton of Southwell
- 1789: John Chamberlin, of Sutton Bonington
- 1790: George Chaworth of Annesley
- 1791: George de Ligne Gregory of Harlaxton
- 1792: Edward Thornton Gould
- 1793: Richard Lumley-Saunderson, 6th Earl of Scarbrough of Rufford Abbey
- 1794: John Simpson of Babworth Hall
- 1795: Jonas Bettison of Holme-Pierrepont
- 1796: John Wright of Nottingham, later of Lenton Hall
- 1797: John Gally Knight
- 1798: Nathaniel Stubbins of Holme Pierrepont
- 1799: Samuel Bristowe

== 19th century ==
- 5 February 1800: William Gregory Williams, of Rempstone
- 11 February 1801: Wiliam Elliott Elliott, of Nottingham
- 3 February 1802: Robert Lowe, of Oxton
- 3 February 1803: William Coape Sherbrooke, of Oxton
- 1 February 1804: Thomas Webb Edge, of Strelley
- 6 February 1805: Christopher Rolleston, of Watnall
- 1 February 1806: Sir Thomas White, 1st Baronet, of Wallingwells
- 4 February 1807: John Longden, of Bramcote Hills
- 3 February 1808: John Manners Sutton, of Kelham Hall
- 6 February 1809: Thomas Walker, of Bury Hill
- 21 February 1810: John Chaworth, of Annesley Hall
- 14 February 1811: Thomas Wright, of Norwood Park
- 24 January 1812: Hugh Blaydes, of Ranby Hall
- 10 February 1813: John Need, of Shirewood Hall
- 4 February 1814: William Fletcher Norton Norton, of Elton
- 13 February 1815: John Smith Wright, of Wilford
- 1816: Robert Howe Bromley, 3rd Baronet
- 1817: Thomas Blackborne Hildyard of Flintham
- 1818: Henry Walker of Blyth
- 1819: Henry Gally Knight of Firbeck Hall
- 1820: Sir Robert Clifton, 7th Baronet of Clifton Hall, Nottingham
- 1821: Thomas Wildman of Newstead Abbey
- 1822: William Farnworth Handley, of Newark-on-Trent
- 1823: William Mason of East Retford
- 1824: William Charlton of Chilwell
- 1825: Gregory Gregory of Rempstone
- 1826: George Saville Foljambe of Osberton
- 1827: Frederick Robinson of Widmerpool
- 1828: John E. Wescombe of Thrumpton
- 1829: John Sherwin Sherwin of Bramcote Hills
- 1830: John Coke, of Mansfield Woodhouse
- 1831: Thomas Moore, of Ruddington
- 1832: Henry Machin, of Gateford Hill
- 1833: Sir Thomas White, 2nd Baronet, of Wallingwells Hall
- 1834: Slingsby Duncombe, of Langford Hall
- 1835: Christopher Nevile, of Thorney
- 1836: John Handley, of Muskham Grange
- 1837: Robert Ramsden, of Carlton in Lindrick
- 1838: Thomas Webb Edge, of Strelley
- 1839: John Evelyn Denison, of Ossington Hall
- 1840: Sir Juckes Granville Juckes-Clifton, 8th Baronet, of Clifton Hall, Nottingham
- 1841: Henry Smith, of Wilford
- 1842: Francis Wright, of Lenton Hall
- 1843: Thomas Dickinson Hall, of Whatton
- 1844: Charles Paget, of Ruddington Grange
- 1845: William Hodgson Barrow, of Southwell
- 1846: Francis Hall, of Park Hall
- 1847: John Vere, of Carlton-upon-Trent
- 1848: John Henry Manners-Sutton, of Kelham Hall, replaced by Robert Holden, of Nuttall Temple
- 1849: Granville Harcourt-Vernon, of Grove
- 1850: Edward Strutt, of Kingston Hall
- 1851: John Francklin, of Gonalston
- 1852: Henry Frederick Walker, of Blyth Hall
- 1853: Thomas Spragging Godfrey of Balderton
- 1854: Samuel Bagnall Wild of Costock
- 1855: Henry Bridgeman Simpson of Babworth
- 1856: Samuel William Welfitt of Langwith Hall
- 1857: Richard Milward of Thurgarton Priory
- 1858: Jonathan Hardcastle of Blidworth Dale
- 1859: Henry Porter Sherbrooke of Oxton
- 1860: Edward Valentine Pegge Burnell of Winkburn Hall
- 1861: Henry Savile of Rufford Abbey
- 1862: Thomas Blackborne Thoroton Hildyard, of Flintham House
- 1863: John Henry Manners-Sutton, of Kelham Hall
- 1864: John Chaworth Musters of Annesley Hall
- 1865: William Frederick Webb of Newstead Abbey
- 1866: Sir Edward Samuel Walker of Berry Hill
- 1867: Sir John Sutton, 3rd Baronet of Norwood Park
- 1868: John Bagshaw Taylor of Radcliffe-upon-Trent
- 1869: John Handley of Newark-upon-Trent
- 1870: James Thomas Edge of Strelley
- 1871: James Thorpe of Coddington
- 1872: George William Mason of Morton Hall, near Retford
- 1873: Henry Eyre of Rampton
- 1874: Robert Kelham of Bleasby
- 1875: Henry Robert Clifton of Clifton
- 1876: John Elliott Burnside of Gedling
- 1877: Lancelot Rolleston of Watnall
- 1878: Robert Laycock of Wiseton
- 1879: Thomas Broughton Charlton of Chilwell
- 1880: William Henry Coape Gates, of Langford Hall
- 1881: George Coke Robertson, of Widmerpool
- 1882: Sir Henry Bromley, 4th Baronet, of East Stoke
- 1883: Percy Hartshorne Cooper, of Bulwell
- 1884: Frederick Chatfield Smith of Bramcote
- 1885: Robert Millington Knowles, of Colston Bassett,
- 1886: Henry Abel Smith, of Wilford
- 1887: Benjamin Huntsman, of West Retford
- 1888: Frederick Platt of Barnby
- 1889: Francis Foljambe, of Osberton
- 1890: Sir Charles Seely, 1st Baronet
- 1891: Lewis Randle Starkey of Norwood Park
- 1892: Sir Thomas Birkin, 1st Baronet
- 1893: Benjamin Ingham Whitaker, of Hesley Hall
- 1894: Edward Evelyn Harcourt-Vernon, of the Grove Hall
- 1895: William Evelyn Denison, of Ossington Hall
- 1896: William Hollies, of Pleasley Vale, Mansfield
- 1897: Philo Laos Mills, of Ruddington Hall
- 1898: Sir George Ernest Paget, 1st Baronet, of Sutton Bonington
- 1899: William Welfit Hall of Park Hall, Mansfield

== 20th century ==
- 1900: Francis Abel Smith of Papplewick Hall, Nottingham
- 1901: John Robinson of Worksop Manor
- 1902: John Patricius Chaworth-Musters of Annesley Park
- 1903: Albert Cantrell Cantrell-Hubbersty of Tollerton Hall
- 1904: Thomas Lewis Kekewich Edge of Strelley Hall
- 1905: Francis Ley of Epperstone Manor (later Sir Francis Ley)
- 1906: Joseph Frederick Laycock of Wiseton Hall, Bawtry
- 1907: Thomas Philip Barber of Lamb Close House, Eastwood
- 1908: Francis Willey, 1st Baron Barnby of Blyth Hall, Rotherham
- 1909: Sir Hugo Meynell FitzHerbert, 6th Baronet of Tissington Hall, Ashbourne, Derbyshire
- 1910: Thomas Craven of Kirklington Hall, Southwell
- 1911: Francis Hall of Park Hall, Mansfield
- 1912: Sir Charles Seely, 2nd Baronet of Wingerworth Hall, Chesterfield
- 1913: William Norton Hicking of Brackenhurst Hall, Southwell
- 1914: Evelyn Kyrle Smith of Oxton Hall, Southwell
- 1915: Sir Thomas Birkin, 2nd Baronet of Park House, Nottingham
- 1916: Major Charles Richard Tennant of St. Ann's Manor, Sutton Bonington
- 1917: Francis Newman Ellis of Debdale Hall, Mansfield
- 1918: William Henry Mason of Morton Hall, East Retford
- 1919: Francis Pegler, of Ordsall Hall, Retford
- 1920: John Plowright Houston of Park Hall, Mansfield Woodhouse
- 1921: Lieut.-Col. Albert Edward Whitaker of Babworth Hall, Retford
- 1922: Lieut.-Col. Frank Evelyn Seely of Ramsdale Park, Arnold.
- 1923: Charles Arthur Longbottom of Forest Hill, Worksop
- 1924: Sir Arthur Ernest Blake of West Leake Manor
- 1925: Hugh Seely, 1st Baron Sherwood of Sherwood Lodge, Arnold
- 1926: Col. Sir Albert Edward Bingham, 2nd Baronet of Ranby House, Retford
- 1927: Stanley Bourne, of Epperstone Manor
- 1928: Sir Ernest Jardine, 1st Baronet of The Park, Nottingham
- 1929: Percy Robert Clifton of Clifton Hall, Nottingham
- 1930: Brigadier-General Sir Edward Thomas Le Marchant, 4th Baronet of Colston Bassett Hall, Bingham, Nottingham
- 1931: Philip Austen Birkin
- 1932: John Jardine, of Clumber Crescent South, The Park, Nottingham
- 1933: Sir Harold Bowden, 2nd Baronet
- 1934: Sir Louis Frederick Pearson of Lenton Grove, Nottingham
- 1935: Lieut.-Col. Noel Gervis Pearson of Bramcote, Nottingham
- 1936: Col. John Neville Chaworth Musters of Annesley Park, Nottingham
- 1937: Claude William Chadburn of The Hall, Papplewick
- 1938: Frank Burton of Orston Hall, Nottingham
- 1939: Frank James Wriothesley Seely of Brick House, Radcliffe-on-Trent
- 1940: Francis Egerton Pegler of Forest Lodge, Blyth, Worksop
- 1941: Lieut.-Col. Sidney Shephard of Elston Hall, Newark
- 1942: Job Nightingale Derbyshire of Rempstone Hall, near Loughborough
- 1943: John Farr of Worksop Manor
- 1944: Lieut-Col. William Allen Potter of Lambley House, Woodborough, Nottingham
- 1945: John Holland Walker of 15, Park Valley, The Park, Nottingham
- 1946: Captain William Frederick Player of The Grange, Staunton
- 1947: Colonel Philip Huskinson Warwick of Normanton Prebend House, Southwell
- 1948: Lieut.-Commander George John Mackness of Mapperley Park, Nottingham
- 1949: George Hamilton Bracher Wilson of The Old Rectory, Plumtree
- 1950: Major-General Sir John Albert Charles Whitaker, 2nd Baronet of Babworth Hall, Retford, Notts, and of Auchnafree, Dunkeld, Perthshire.
- 1951: Major Edward Harold Spalding, of Flawborough Hall, near Newark.
- 1952: Colonel Sir Joseph Nall of Hoveringham Hall
- 1953: Captain Stephen Cecil Armitage of Hawksworth Manor
- 1954: Major-General Robert Edward Laycock of Wiseton Hall, near Doncaster
- 1955: Sir Stuart Coldwell Goodwin of Hexgreave Park, Farnsfield
- 1956: Captain Richard Wing of The Old Manor House, East Bridgford
- 1957: Lieut.-Colonel George Halliburton Foster Peel Vere-Laurie of Carlton Hall, Carlton-on-Trent, Newark
- 1958: Rear-Admiral Robert St. Vincent Sherbrooke of Oxton, Newark
- 1959: Sir Edward Dave Asher Herbert of West Leake Manor, near Loughborough
- 1960: Lieut.-Colonel Thomas Eben Forman Hardy Car Colston Hall, Car Colston
- 1961: Major Samuel John Markham Hole of Caunton Manor, Newark
- 1962: Sir Charles James Buchanan, 4th Baronet
- 1963: Colonel Patrick James Danvers McCraith of Cranfield House, Southwell
- 1964: Sir William Barber, 2nd Baronet
- 1965: Commander Mavourn Baldwin Philip Francklin of Gonalston Hall
- 1966: George FitzRoy Seymour of Thrumpton Hall
- 1967: Brigadier John Anstey of The Old House, Epperstone
- 1968: Colonel Alfred Arthur Warburton of Wigthorpe House, near Worksop
- 1969: Sir James Herbert Ingham Whitaker of Babworth Hall, Retford
- 1970: Sir Paul Mason of Morton Hall, Retford
- 1971: Lieut-Commander Sir Michael Joseph Nall of Hoveringham Hall, Nottingham
- 1972: Bryan Henry Farr of Worksop Manor, Worksop
- 1973: Anthony Christopher Multon Battiscombe Scott of Green Mile, Babworth, Retford.
- 1974: Major-General Robert Gordon-Finlayson of South Collingham Manor, near Newark.
- 1975: Captain John Stephen Dobson of Papplewick Lodge, Papplewick, near Mansfield.
- 1976: Andrew George Buchanan of Hodsock Priory, Blyth, Worksop.
- 1977: Charles Gordon Mackie of The Old Rectory, Elton.
- 1978: Major Richard Francis Abel Smith of Blidworth Dale House, Ravenshead.
- 1979: Christopher Gerald Pole-Carew of New Field House, near Screveton.
- 1980: Richard William Durrant Hanson of Budby Castle, Newark.
- 1981: Captain John Henry Warrand Hammer of Colston Bassett House, Colston Bassett.
- 1982: Robin Brackenbury of Holme Pierrepont Hall, Holme Pierrepont
- 1983: John Davenport Radford of The Burgage, Burgage Green, Southwell.
- 1984: Colonel James Mayo Alastair Gunn of Epperstone House, Epperstone.
- 1985: Nicholas John Forman Hardy of Cropwell Court, Cropwell Butler
- 1986: Ian David Peel Thorne of Beauchamp Barn, Kneesall
- 1987: Sir John Philip Starkey, 3rd Baronet of Norwood Park, Southwell.
- 1988: John Edward Madocks of Middleton Crescent, Beeston
- 1989: Richard Assheton Craven-Smith-Milnes of Winkburn Hall, Newark
- 1990: Marcia Abel Smith of Blidworth Dale, Ravenshead
- 1991: George Edward Vere-Laurie of Carlton Hall, Carlton-on-Trent, Newark.
- 1992: Ian Hugh Phillipps of Grange Farm, Rempstone, Loughborough, Leicestershire.
- 1993: Juliet Lilias Mortensen
- 1994: Richard Bertram Godwin-Austen of Papplewick Hall, Papplewick.
- 1995: George Edmund Peter Thornhill of The Grove, Winthorpe, Newark.
- 1996: Trevor Forsyth Parr of The Old Rectory, Widmerpool.
- 1997: Hugh Matheson of Thoresby Park, Newark.
- 1998: Jennifer Margaret Fair, Lanesmeet, Epperstone.
- 1999: Alexander Michael Nall, Hockerton Manor, Hockerton

== 21st century ==
- 2000: Barbara Ann Vere-Laurie, Carlton Hall, Carlton-on-Trent, near Newark.
- 2001: Sir John James Ingham Whitaker, Babworth Hall, Retford.
- 2002: Colonel Timothy Stewart Richmond, The Old Vicarage, Southwell Park, Kirklington.
- 2003: William Henry Marcello Parente, of Welbeck Abbey
- 2004: Henry Vessey Machin, of Keepers Castle, Gateford, Worksop
- 2005: Anthony Harwick Wilkinson
- 2006: Christopher Battiscombe-Scott
- 2007: Commander Peter Russell Moore
- 2008: Colonel Roger Merryweather, of Brinkley, Southwell
- 2009: John Michael Rowen, of Cropwell Butler
- 2010: Amanda Margaret Farr, of Kirklington
- 2011: John Peace, of Manor Road, Caunton
- 2012: Charles Phillip Liell Francklin of Gonalston, Nottingham
- 2013: Nicola June Weston of Shelford Nottingham
- 2014: Graham S Cartledge of Caunton, Newark
- 2015: Dr Jaswant Singh Bilkhu of Radcliffe-on-Trent, Nottingham
- 2016: Judith Lynne Naake of Bramcote
- 2017: Colonel David Rupert Sneath of Nottingham
- 2018: Professor Nicholas Richard Brian Ebbs of Ravenhead, Nottingham
- 2019: Jonathan James Teare of Oxton, Southwell
- 2020: Professor Dame Elizabeth Harriet Fradd of Tollerton
- 2021: Professor Harminder Singh Dua of Redhill
- 2022: Paul David Southby of Ravenshead
- 2023: Professor Veronica Moraa Pickering of Lambley, Nottinghamshire
- 2024: Nicholas David Rubins of The Park, Nottingham
- 2025: Edward John Attenborough, Nottingham
- 2026: Merlita Bryan-Hilton, Nottingham

== See also ==
- Sheriff of Nottingham
- Sheriff of Nottingham (position)
