= Hugonin =

Hugonin may refer to

- Francis Hugonin (British Army officer) (1750–1836), a British Army general
- Francis Hugonin (1897–1967) a British soldier and cricketer
