= Robert Markham (MP) =

16th-century English politician

Robert Markham (1536–1606) was an English politician.

He was born the eldest son of John Markham of Cotham, Nottinghamshire.

He was appointed a justice of the peace (J.P.) for Nottinghamshire from 1564 and High Sheriff of Nottinghamshire for 1571–2 and 1583–4.

He was a member (MP) of the Parliament of England for Nottinghamshire in 1571 and 1589 and Grantham in 1586.

He married twice: firstly Mary, the daughter of Francis Leck of Sutton in the Dale, Derbyshire with whom he had five sons and three daughters; and secondly Jane, the daughter of William Burnell of Winkburn.
