= Veronica Moraa Pickering =

Kenyan-British Lord Lieutenant (born 1963)

Veronica Moraa Pickering (born 1963) is a Kenyan-born-British social worker.

== Life and work ==
Pickering was born in Kenya, moving to the UK with her parents at the age of 7. She was the first African-born woman to be appointed as Air commodore in the Royal Air Force.

In 2023, she held the position of High Sheriff of Nottinghamshire.

In March 2024, following the retirement of John Peace, she was appointed Lord Lieutenant of Nottinghamshire.
