= Milne baronets of Inveresk (1876) =

The Milne baronetcy, of Inveresk in the County of East Lothian, was a title in the Baronetage of the United Kingdom. It was created on 1 November 1876 for Sir Alexander Milne, Admiral of the Royal Navy. He was the second son of Admiral David Milne.

The baronetcy became extinct in 1938 on the death of the 2nd Baronet.

== Milne baronets, of Inveresk (1876) ==
- Sir Alexander Milne, 1st Baronet (1806–1896)
- Sir Archibald Berkeley Milne, 2nd Baronet (1855–1938)

== Notes ==
Baronetage of the United Kingdom
Preceded by Falshaw baronets	Milne baronets of Inveresk; 1 November 1876	Succeeded by Buchanan baronets
