= HMS Venus (1895) =

Eclipse-class cruiser

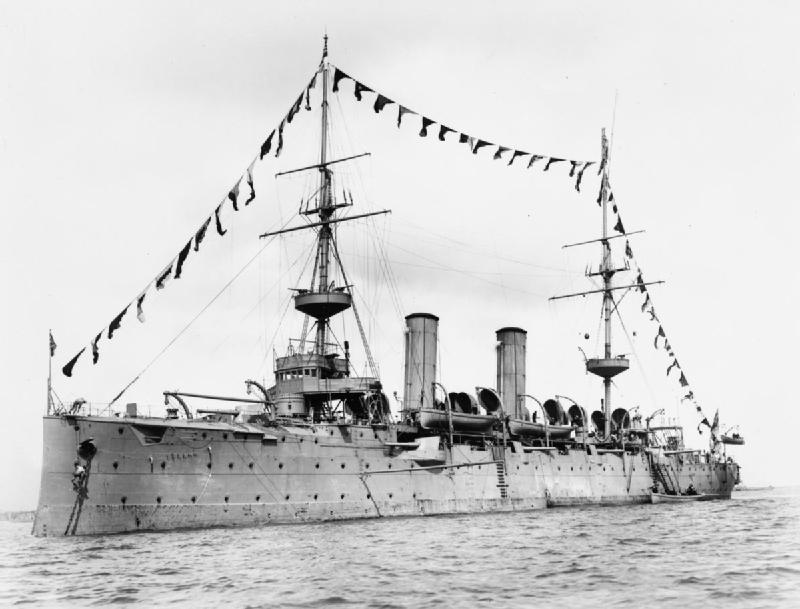
- Venus at anchor during World War I

History

United Kingdom
- Name: HMS Venus
- Namesake: Venus
- Builder: Fairfield Shipbuilding & Engineering, Govan
- Laid down: 28 June 1894
- Launched: 5 September 1895
- Completed: 9 November 1897
- Fate: Sold for scrap, 22 September 1921

General characteristics
- Class & type: Eclipse-class protected cruiser
- Displacement: 5,600 long tons (5,690 t)
- Length: 350 ft (106.7 m)
- Beam: 53 ft 6 in (16.3 m)
- Draught: 20 ft 6 in (6.25 m)
- Installed power: 9,600 ihp (7,200 kW); 8 cylindrical boilers
- Propulsion: 2 shafts, 2 Inverted triple-expansion steam engines
- Speed: 18.5 knots (34.3 km/h; 21.3 mph)
- Complement: 450
- Armament: As built: 5 × QF 6-inch (152 mm) guns; 6 × QF 4.7-inch (120 mm) guns; 6 × 3-pounder QF guns; 3 × 18-inch torpedo tubes; After 1905: 11 × six-inch QF guns; 9 × 12-pounder QF guns; 7 × 3-pounder QF guns; 3 × 18-inch torpedo tubes
- Armour: Gun shields: 3 in (76 mm); Engine hatch: 6 in (152 mm); Decks: 1.5–3 in (38–76 mm); Conning tower: 6 in (152 mm)

HMS Venus was an Eclipse-class protected cruiser built for the Royal Navy in the mid-1890s.

== Design ==
Eclipse-class second-class protected cruisers were preceded by the shorter Astraea-class cruisers. Venus had a displacement of 5,600 long tons (5,700 t; 6,300 short tons) when at normal load. She had a total length of 373 ft (114 m), a beam of 53 ft 6 in (16.31 m), a metacentric height of around 3 m (9 ft 10 in), and a draught of 20 ft 6 in (6.25 m). She was powered by two inverted triple-expansion steam engines which used steam from eight cylindrical boilers. Using normal draught, the boilers were intended to provide the engines with enough steam to generate 8,000 indicated horsepower (6,000 kW) and to reach a speed of 18.5 knots (34.3 km/h; 21.3 mph); using forced draft, the equivalent figures were 9,600 indicated horsepower (7,200 kW) and a speed of 19.5 knots (36.1 km/h; 22.4 mph). Eclipse-class cruisers carried a maximum of 1,075 long tons (1,092 t) of coal and achieved maximum speed of 20 knots (37 km/h; 23 mph) in sea trials.

She carried five 40-calibre 6-inch (152 mm) quick-firing (QF) guns in single mounts protected by gun shields. One gun was mounted on the forecastle, two on the quarterdeck and one pair was abreast the bridge. They fired 100-pound (45 kg) shells at a muzzle velocity of 2,205 ft/s (672 m/s). The secondary armament consisted of six 40-calibre 4.7-inch (120 mm) guns; three on each broadside. Their 45-pound (20.4 kg) shells were fired at a muzzle velocity of 2,125 ft/s (648 m/s). She was fitted with three 18-inch torpedo tubes, one submerged tube on each broadside and one above water in the stern. Her ammunition supply consisted of 200 six-inch rounds per gun, 250 shells for each 4.7-inch gun, 300 rounds per gun for the 12-pounders and 500 for each three-pounder. Venus had ten torpedoes, presumably four for each broadside tube and two for the stern tube.

== Service history ==
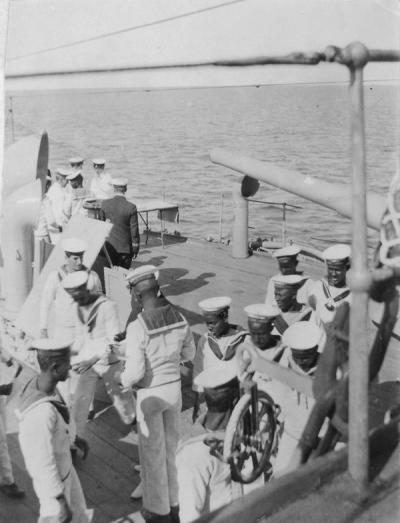
Somali crewmen on the quarterdeck of Venus at Singapore

Venus was launched at Fairfield's Govan shipyard on 5 September 1895.Venus was commissioned by Sir Archibald Berkeley Milne in November 1897, and served at the Mediterranean Station. The ship paid off in March 1901 at Chatham Dockyard. In March 1900 she visited Corfu.

She was recommissioned at Chatham on 7 February 1903 with the crew of HMS Australia, whose duties as coastguard ship at Southampton Water she took over. During this period she was also used as a training ship for naval cadets.

During 1906, Venus was frequently used to patrol waters near Alexandria, and was involved in preventing a mutiny at Port Said.

In 1908 Venus attended the Quebec Tercentenary in Canada. She joined the 3rd Fleet at Pembroke in 1913 and went to Portsmouth in 1914. Joined the 11th Cruiser Squadron in Ireland in August 1914; captured two German merchantmen in October and lost her foremast in a gale in November 1914. To Egypt 1916; Singapore March 1917; flagship East Indies 1919 until she returned home in May 1919 to pay off.

== Bibliography ==
- Chesneau, Roger; Kolesnik, Eugene M., eds. (1979). Conway's All the World's Fighting Ships 1860–1905. Greenwich, UK: Conway Maritime Press. ISBN 0-8317-0302-4.
- Colledge, J. J.; Warlow, Ben (2006) [1969]. Ships of the Royal Navy: The Complete Record of All Fighting Ships of the Royal Navy from the 15th Century to the Present (3rd Rev ed.). London: Chatham Publishing. ISBN 978-1-86176-281-8. OCLC 67375475.
- Gardiner, Robert; Gray, Randal, eds. (1985). Conway's All the World's Fighting Ships 1906–1921. Annapolis, Maryland: Naval Institute Press. ISBN 0-85177-245-5.
- Friedman, Norman (2011). Naval Weapons of World War One. Barnsley, South Yorkshire, UK: Seaforth. ISBN 978-1-84832-100-7.
- McBride, Keith (2012). "The Cruiser Family Talbot". In John Jordan (ed.). Warship 2012. London: Conway. pp. 136–41. ISBN 978-1-84486-156-9.
