= Sir Andrew Buchanan, 5th Baronet =

British farmer and public servant

Sir Andrew George Buchanan, 5th Baronet, KCVO, DL (born 1937) is a British farmer and public servant.

The son of the 4th Baronet (an Army officer) and his wife Barbara, daughter of the politician Sir George Stanley, he attended Eton College and Trinity College, Cambridge, and Wye College. After national service, he eventually worked as a chartered surveyor from 1965 to 1970, but later turned to farming.

He was High Sheriff of Nottinghamshire for the 1976–77 year and appointed a deputy lieutenant in 1985, the year after he succeeded to his father's baronetcy; between 1991 and 2012, he was Lord Lieutenant of Nottinghamshire and was appointed a Knight Commander of the Royal Victorian Order in the 2011 New Year Honours for his service in that office.

Coat of arms of Sir Andrew Buchanan, 5th Baronet
Crest An armed dexter hand holding a cap of dignity Purpure facing Ermine. Escutcheon Or a lion rampant Sable between two otters’ heads erased in chief Proper and a cinquefoil in base of the second all within the Royal tressure of the last. Supporters Dexter a falcon wings elevated and addorsed Proper belled beaked and charged on the breast with two branches of laurel conjoined Or sinister a gryphon Sable charged in like manner with two branches of laurel. Motto Nunquam Victus

Baronetage of the United Kingdom
Preceded by Charles James Buchanan	Baronet (of Dunburgh); 1984–present	Incumbent
