= Charles James Buchanan =

British peer (1899–1984)

Major Sir Charles James Buchanan, 4th Baronet (16 April 1899 – 25 May 1984) was High Sheriff of Nottinghamshire in 1962.

== Family ==
He was born on 16 April 1899, the son of Sir Eric Alexander Buchanan, 3rd Baronet and Constance Augusta Tennant. He married Barbara Helen Stanley, daughter of Lt.-Col. Rt. Hon. Sir George Frederick Stanley and Lady Beatrix Taylour on 23 February 1932. He worked for George Frederick Stanley who was Governor of Madras, and Charles Buchanan was his Aide-de-camp. The children from this marriage were:

- Georgina Mary Gabrielle Buchanan (b. 15 Dec 1932)
- Constance Carolyn Buchanan (b. 31 Dec 1934)
- Sir Andrew George Buchanan, 5th Baronet (b. 21 Jul 1937)
- Hugh Charles Stanley Buchanan (b. 26 Aug 1942)

== Career ==
He was educated at Windlesham House and Harrow School and the Royal Military College, Sandhurst. He gained the rank of Major in the service of the Highland Light Infantry. He fought in the Russian Civil War in 1919, in the North Russia Relief Force. He was Aide-de-camp to the List of colonial Governors and Presidents of Madras Presidency between 1928 and 1932 (one of whom, George Frederick Stanley, was his future father-in-law) and he fought in the Second World War

He succeeded to the title of 4th Baronet Buchanan, of Dunburgh on 29 July 1928.

He was admitted to Royal Company of Archers in 1930.

He held the office of Justice of the Peace for Nottinghamshire in 1952. He held the office of Deputy Lieutenant of Nottinghamshire in 1954. He held the office of High Sheriff of Nottinghamshire in 1962.

He died in 1984.

== Arms ==
Coat of arms of Charles James Buchanan
Crest An armed dexter hand holding a cap of dignity Purpure facing Ermine. Escutcheon Or a lion rampant Sable between two otters' heads erased in chief Proper and a cinquefoil in base of the second all within the Royal tressure of the last. Supporters Dexter a falcon wings elevated and addorsed Proper belled beaked and charged on the breast with two branches of laurel conjoined Or sinister a gryphon Sable charged in like manner with two branches of laurel. Motto Nunquam Victus

Baronetage of the United Kingdom
Preceded by Eric Alexander Buchanan	Baronet (of Dunburgh); 1928–1984	Succeeded by Andrew Buchanan
