= Winkburn =

Village and civil parish in Nottinghamshire, England

Coordinates: 53.118°N 0.939°W

- Village and civil parish
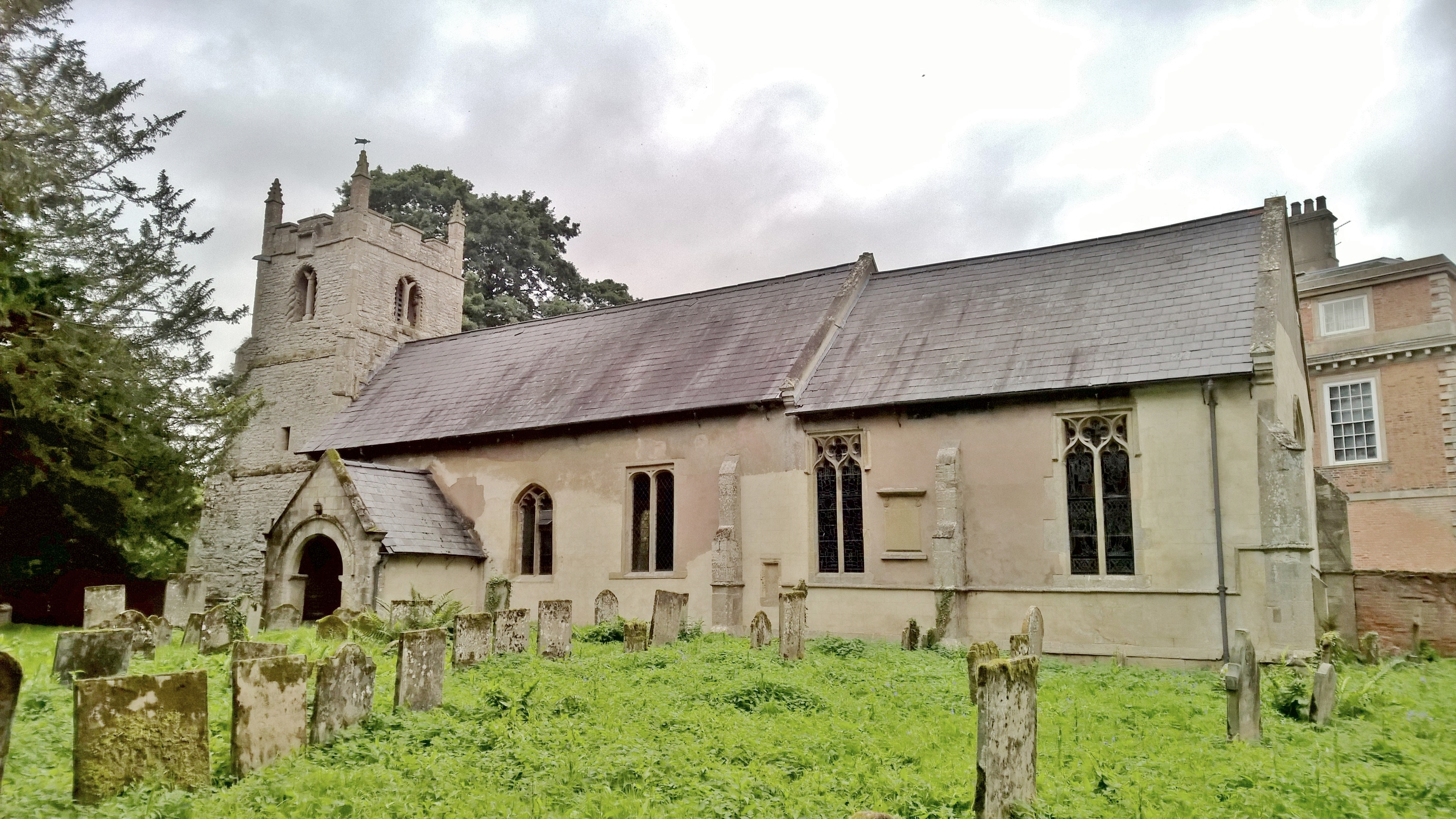
- St John of Jerusalem, Winkburn

- Location within Nottinghamshire
- Interactive map of Winkburn
- Area: 3.7 sq mi (9.6 km^{2})
- Population: 103 (2021)
  - Density: 28/sq mi (11/km^{2})
- OS grid reference: SK 710584
  - London: 115 mi (185 km) SSE
- District: Newark and Sherwood
- Shire county: Nottinghamshire
- Region: East Midlands
- Country: England
- Sovereign state: United Kingdom
- Post town: Southwell
- Postcode district: NG22
- Dialling code: 01636
- Police: Nottinghamshire
- Fire: Nottinghamshire
- Ambulance: East Midlands
- UK Parliament: Newark

Winkburn is a small village and civil parish in the Newark and Sherwood district, in Nottinghamshire, England. It is located north-west of Southwell and north-west of Newark. Its population count was reported as 103 residents in the 2021 census.

== History ==
The parish church of St John of Jerusalem and Winkburn Hall are both Grade I listed buildings.

=== 1955 air incident ===
Provost YG502 crashed on Friday 14 October 1955 at Park Springs Wood, which killed instructor 33 year old Sqn Ldr George Herbert Tasney, of Flintham, and pilot 19 year old Alastair Hugh Gavin Low, of Hinderton Road, in Neston in west Cheshire.

Fire engines attended from Newark and Southwell.

== See also ==
- Listed buildings in Winkburn
