= Sir Andrew Buchanan, 1st Baronet =

Scottish diplomat

The Right Honourable Sir Andrew Buchanan Bt
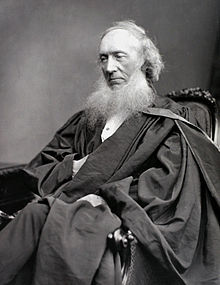
- Sir Andrew Buchanan 1st Baronet Portrait

Minister Plenipotentiary to the Swiss Confederation
- In office 1852–1853
- Preceded by: Arthur Charles Magenis
- Succeeded by: Charles Murray

Personal details
- Born: Sir Andrew Buchanan; 7 May 1807
- Died: 12 November 1882 (aged 75) Craigend Castle, Milngavie, Scotland
- Occupation: Diplomat

Sir Andrew Buchanan, 1st Baronet, GCB, PC, DL (7 May 1807 – 12 November 1882) was a British diplomat.

== Family ==
Buchanan was the only son of James Buchanan of Blairvadach, Ardinconnal, Dunbartonshire, and Janet, the eldest daughter of James Sinclair, 12th Earl of Caithness.

On 4 April 1839, he married Frances Katharine, the daughter of the Very Rev Edward Mellish, dean of Hereford. She died 4 December 1854. The children from this marriage were:

- Louisa Buchanan (d. 19 Jan 1923)
- Frances Matilda Buchanan (d. 13 Dec 1908)
- Sir James Buchanan, 2nd Baronet (7 Aug 1840 – 16 Oct 1901)
- Sir Eric Alexander Buchanan, 3rd Baronet (19 Aug 1848 – 29 Jul 1928)
- Andrew Archibald Buchanan (16 Jan 1850 – 5 Oct 1932)
- Rt. Hon. Sir George William Buchanan (25 Nov 1854 – 20 Dec 1924)

Secondly, on 27 May 1857, Buchanan married Hon. Georgiana Elizabeth Stuart, the third daughter of Robert Walter Stuart, 11th Lord Blantyre.

Buchanan was related to Sir James Douglas.

== Career ==
Buchanan entered the diplomatic service 10 October 1825 and was attached to the embassy at Constantinople.

On 13 November 1830, he was named paid attaché at Rio de Janeiro, but he did not remain long in South America, as he served temporarily with Sir Stratford Canning's special embassy to Constantinople from 31 October 1831 to 18 September 1832. He later became paid attaché at Washington, D.C. on 9 November. He was with Sir Charles Vaughan's special mission to Constantinople from March 1837 to September 1838 and then proceeded to Saint Petersburg as paid attaché on 6 October 1838.

Few men seem to have gone through a greater number of changes in the diplomatic service; he was secretary of legation at Florence 24 August 1841 and chargé d'affaires from July 1842 to October 1843 and from March to May 1844. At Saint Petersburg he was secretary of legation 1844 and between that time and 1851 several times acted as chargé d'affaires. From 1852, he was for one year Minister Plenipotentiary to the Swiss Confederation.

In 1853, he was named envoy extraordinary to the king of Denmark, and he acted as her majesty's representative at the conference of Copenhagen in November 1855 for the definite arrangement of the Sound Dues question.

He had been appointed a Commander of the Order of the Bath (C.B.) o 23 May 1857, He was transferred to Madrid 31 March 1858 and promoted to Knight Commander (K.C.B.) 25 February 1860 and then to The Hague on 11 December 1860.

He became ambassador extraordinary and plenipotentiary to the King of Prussia 28 October 1862 for which he was sworn to the Privy Council. He served on the Privy Council on 3 February 1863. He was sent as Ambassador Extraordinary to the Russian Empire on 15 September 1864, raised to Knight Grand Cross (G.C.B.) on 6 July 1866 and made ambassador to Austria-Hungary from 16 October 1871 to 16 February 1878, when he retired on a pension. He was created a baronet on 14 December 1878 and died at Craigend Castle, in Milngavie, near Glasgow.

== Arms ==
Coat of arms of Sir Andrew Buchanan, 1st Baronet
Crest An armed dexter hand holding a cap of dignity Purpure facing Ermine. Escutcheon Or a lion rampant Sable between two otters' heads erased in chief Proper and a cinquefoil in base of the second all within the Royal tressure of the last. Supporters Dexter a falcon wings elevated and addorsed Proper belled beaked and charged on the breast with two branches of laurel conjoined Or sinister a gryphon Sable charged in like manner with two branches of laurel. Motto Nunquam Victus

== Notes ==
Diplomatic posts
Preceded by Arthur Charles Magenis	Minister Plenipotentiary to the Swiss Confederation; 1852–1853	Succeeded by Hon. Charles Augustus Murray
Preceded by Lord Augustus Loftus	British Minister to Prussia; 1862–1864	Succeeded by The Lord Napier (as Ambassador)
Baronetage of the United Kingdom
New creation	Baronet (of Dunburgh); 1878–1882	Succeeded by James Buchanan
