= Robert Herdman =

Scottish artist (1829–1888)

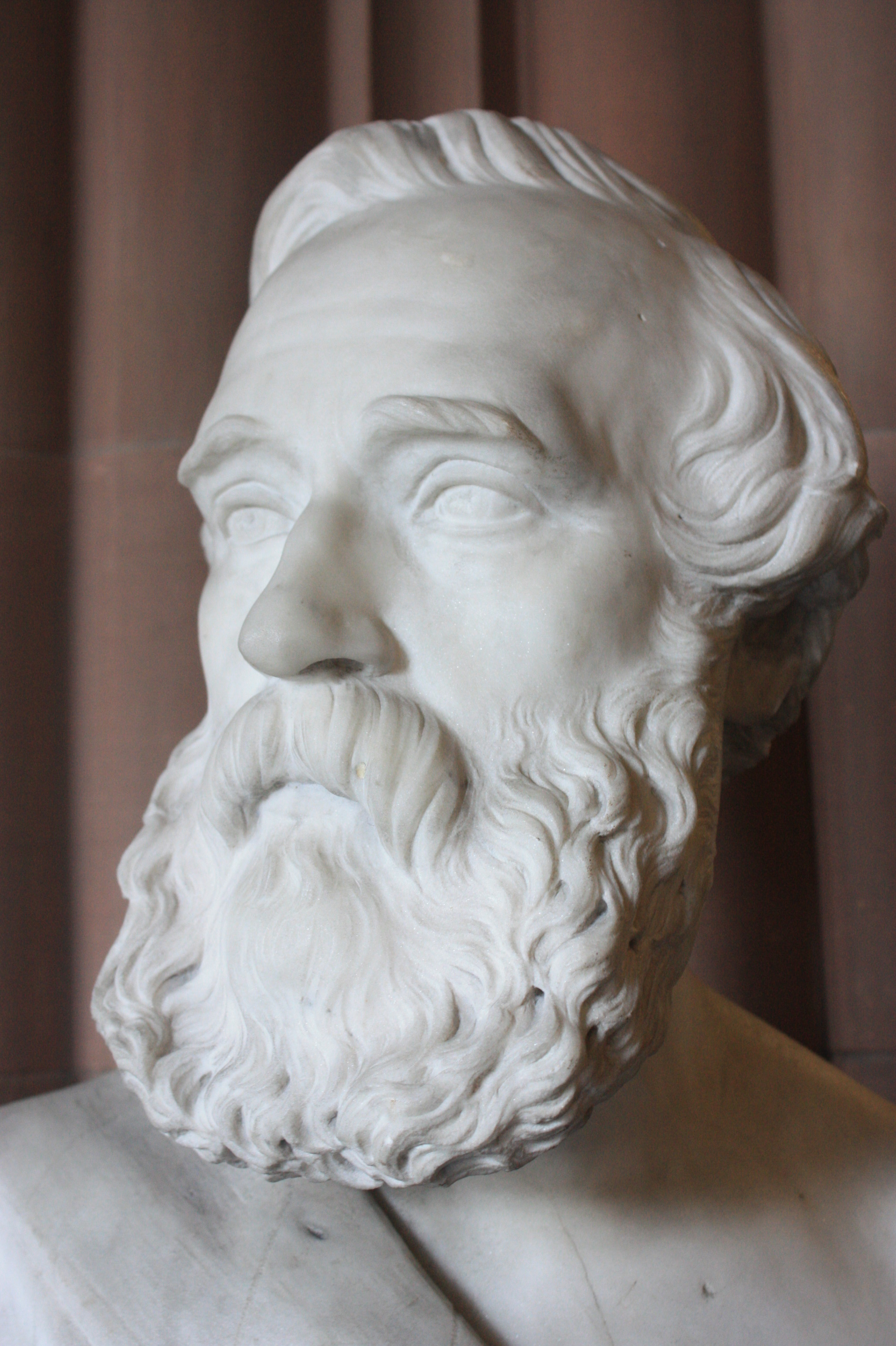
Robert Herdman by William Brodie, 1859, Scottish National Portrait Gallery

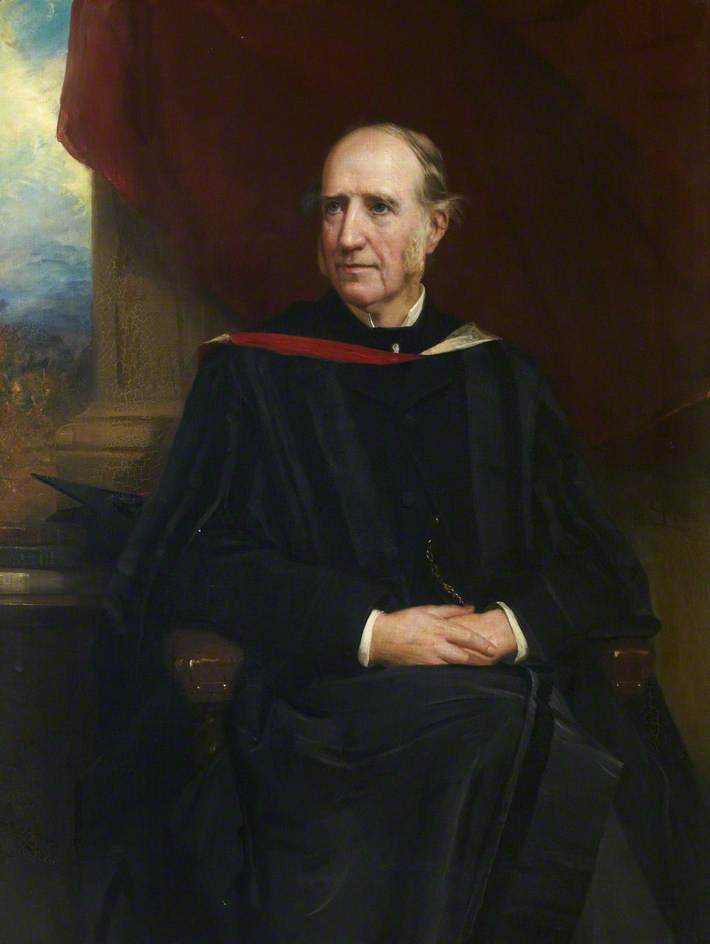
John Campbell Shairp by Robert Herdman (1886)

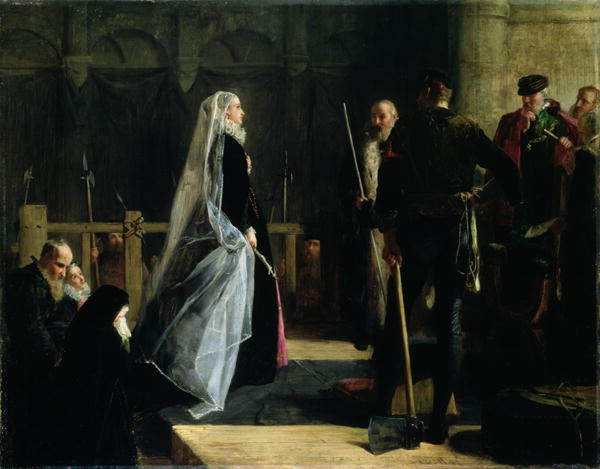
The Execution of Mary, Queen of Scots

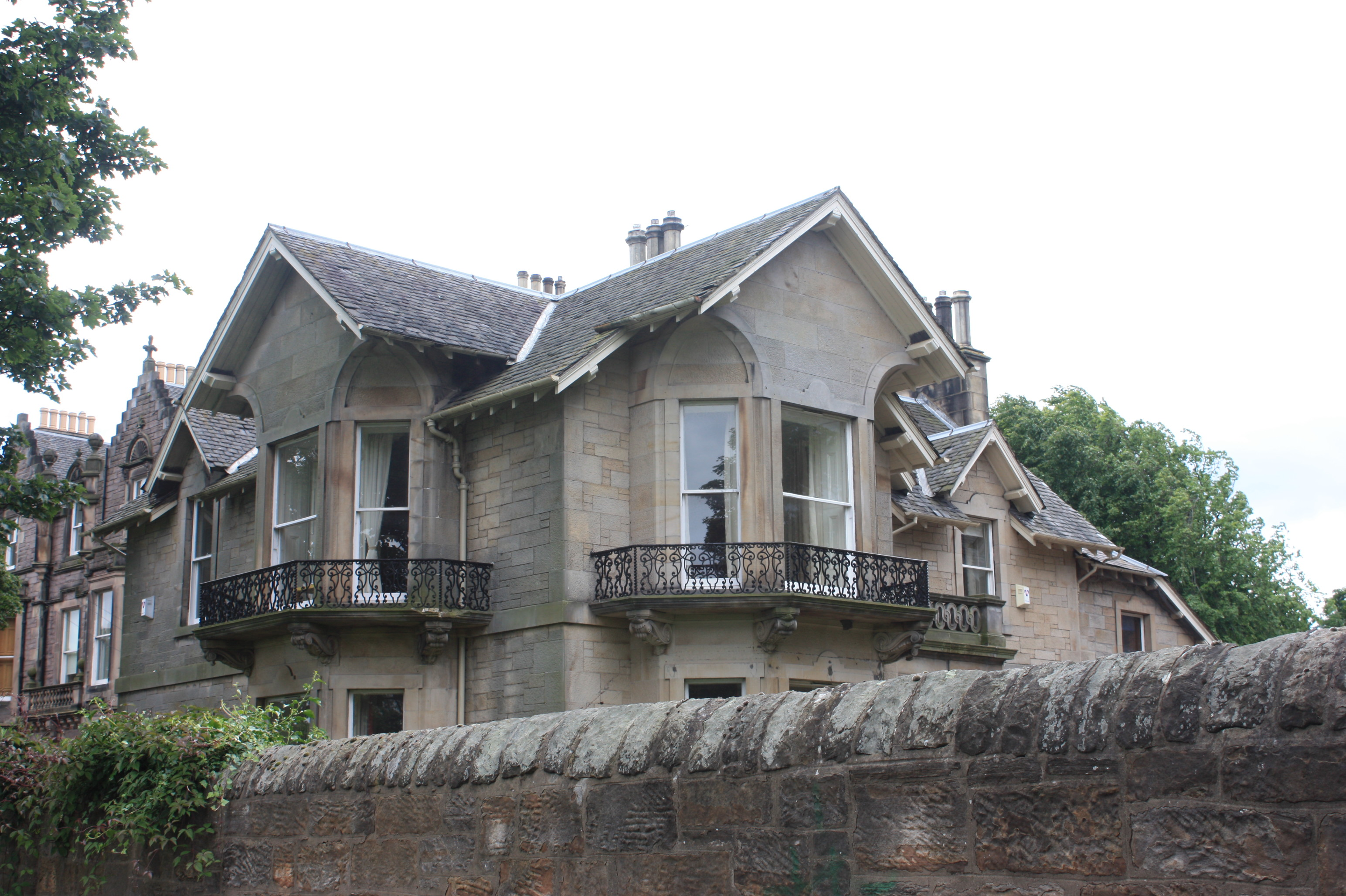
Herdman's house at 12 Bruntsfield Crescent, Edinburgh

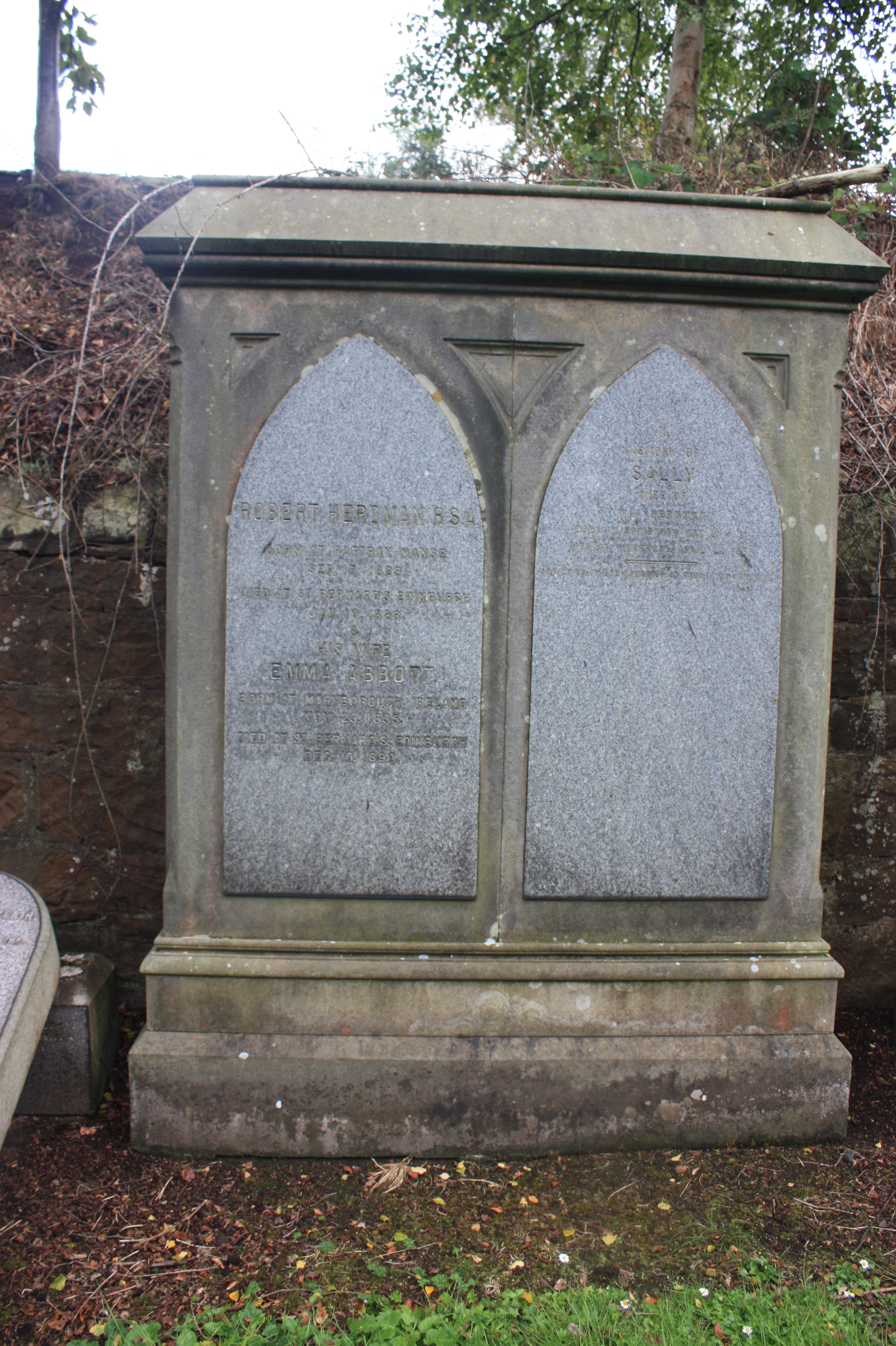
Robert Herdman's grave, Grange Cemetery

Robert Inerarity Herdman RSA RSW (17 September 1829 – 10 January 1888) was a Scottish artist specialising in portraiture and historical compositions. He is also remembered for a series of pastoral scenes featuring young girls.

He received commissions from most Scottish city councils, and is work is found in many galleries including the Royal Scottish Academy and National Portrait Gallery, London.

He was elected an Associate of the RSA in 1861 and became a Fellow in 1863. He exhibited at the Royal Academy and British Institution in London 1861–1887. He exhibited in Philadelphia in 1876 and Paris in 1878.

== Life ==
Herdman was born in Rattray near Blairgowrie in Perthshire. He is known to have originally studied divinity at the University of St. Andrews but abandoned this and came to Edinburgh in 1847 to train under Robert Scott Lauder as an artist. He was a friend of Professor John Stuart Blackie, who instilled in him a love of the Celtic Revival reflected in his later works.

He lived mainly in Edinburgh. In the 1860s he lived at 32 Danube street. In the 1880s he is listed as living at 12 Bruntsfield Crescent

He died in Edinburgh and is buried there in the Grange Cemetery on the outer side of the northern slope to the central vaults.

== Family ==
He was married to Emma Abbott. Their son William Abbott Herdman FRSE was an eminent oceanographer who served on the Challenger Expedition.

His son Robert Duddingston Herdman (1863–1922) was also an artist.

== Public works ==
This list is derived from multiple sources,

- "After the Battle", "A Riverbank at Corrie, Arran", and a portrait of Baroness Shand (1867), National Gallery of Scotland
- Charles Shaw-Lefevre, 1st Viscount Eversley (1794–1888), Hampshire County Council Arts and Museums collection
- "Sleep", Leeds Museum
- "Morning", "Evening", "Pleasures of Hope" and "Lochiel's Warning", Glasgow City Museum
- Sir James David Marwick (1826–1908), Town Clerk of Glasgow, Glasgow City Museum
- Sir William Collins (1817–1895), Lord Provost of Glasgow 1877-80, Glasgow City Museum
- Rev George S. Burns, Minister of Glasgow Cathedral, Glasgow City Museum
- Sir James Watson (1801–1889), Lord Provost of Glasgow 1871-4, Glasgow City Museum
- Peter Clouston, Lord Provost of Glasgow 1860-3, Glasgow City Museum
- "The Execution of Mary, Queen of Scots", Glasgow City Museum
- "A Sprig of Arran Heather", Broughty Castle Museum
- "A Pilot" (river pilot), "Wae's Me" and "Fern Gatherer", Dundee City Council
- George Rough, Lord Provost of Dundee, Dundee City Council
- Sir James Falshaw, Lord Provost of Edinburgh 1874-7, Edinburgh City Chambers
- "The Time of Primroses", "The Arrochar Gleaner" (1862) and "A Fountain Group, South Italy", Aberdeen Art Gallery
- Self-Portrait (1883), Aberdeen Art Gallery
- Alexander Laing LLD, Newburgh, Fife Council
- Sir Joseph Noel Paton, Fife Council
- John Campbell Shairp, University of St. Andrews
- John Tulloch (1823–1886), University of St. Andrews (two paintings)
- "Bonny Bell", "St. Columba Rescuing a Captive" and "Nary Queen of Scots meeting John Knox at Holyrood Palace", Perth and Kinross Council
- Sir Theodore Martin, National Portrait Gallery, London (1876)
- "Gathering Ferns", Melbourne, Australia
- "Who Still Dreams can Hear the Heavenly Harps", Greenock Art Gallery
- "La Culla" Royal Scottish Academy

== Other known portraits ==
- The Rev William Scott-Moncrieff
- Jane Amelia Wilson (later Mrs. Balfour-Melville)
