= Sir James Buchanan, 2nd Baronet =

Sir James Buchanan, 2nd Baronet DL (7 August 1840 – 16 October 1901) was a British Royal Navy officer and Deputy Lieutenant of Stirlingshire.

== Family ==
Buchanan was born on 7 August 1840, the son of Rt. Hon. Sir Andrew Buchanan, 1st Baronet and Frances Katharine Mellish.

He married Arabella Catherine Colquitt-Craven, daughter of Goodwin Charles Colquitt-Craven of Brockhampton Park, near Cheltenham, on 19 February 1873. There were no children from this marriage.

== Naval career ==
He joined the Royal Navy being mate on 12 April 1860, lieutenant on 22 May 1861, and gained the rank of commander in the service of the Royal Navy. He was serving on HMS Geyser in 1862 under the command of Commander Colin Andrew Campbell. By 1867 he was aboard HMS Antelope as lieutenant commander until he was invalided. He retired from the Royal Navy on 30 January 1873.

== Later life ==
He succeeded to the title of 2nd Baronet Buchanan, of Dunburgh on 13 November 1882.

He held the office of Justice of the Peace, and Deputy Lieutenant of Stirlingshire.

He died at his residence, Craigend Castle, Milngavie, near Glasgow, on 16 October 1901, at age 61, and was succeeded in the baronetcy by his brother, Eric Alexander Buchanan.

== Arms ==
Coat of arms of Sir James Buchanan, 2nd Baronet
Crest An armed dexter hand holding a cap of dignity Purpure facing Ermine. Escutcheon Or a lion rampant Sable between two otters' heads erased in chief Proper and a cinquefoil in base of the second all within the Royal tressure of the last. Supporters Dexter a falcon wings elevated and addorsed Proper belled beaked and charged on the breast with two branches of laurel conjoined Or sinister a gryphon Sable charged in like manner with two branches of laurel. Motto Nunquam Victus

Baronetage of the United Kingdom
Preceded by Andrew Buchanan	Baronet (of Dunburgh); 1882–1901	Succeeded by Eric Alexander Buchanan
