= Eric Alexander Buchanan =

Sir Eric Alexander Buchanan, 3rd Baronet (19 August 1848 – 29 July 1928) was the 3rd Baronet Buchanan of Dunburgh.

He was born on 19 August 1848. He was the son of Rt. Hon. Sir Andrew Buchanan, 1st Baronet and Frances Katharine Mellish. He was educated at Wellington College, Berkshire.

He married Constance Augusta Tennant, daughter of Charles Edmund Tennant RN of Needwood House, Burton-on-Trent, on 27 June 1898. The children from the marriage were:

- Major Sir Charles James Buchanan, 4th Baronet (16 April 1899 – 1984)
- Mary Constance Victoria Buchanan (22 January 1901 – 26 October 1982) married in 1921 Major Thomas Garrett Mayhew (died 1965).

He succeeded to the title of 3rd Baronet Buchanan of Dunburgh on 16 October 1901. He died on 29 July 1928, age 79.

Coat of arms of Eric Alexander Buchanan
Crest An armed dexter hand holding a cap of dignity Purpure facing Ermine. Escutcheon Or a lion rampant Sable between two otters’ heads erased in chief Proper and a cinquefoil in base of the second all within the Royal tressure of the last. Supporters Dexter a falcon wings elevated and addorsed Proper belled beaked and charged on the breast with two branches of laurel conjoined Or sinister a gryphon Sable charged in like manner with two branches of laurel. Motto Nunquam Victus

Baronetage of the United Kingdom
Preceded by James Buchanan	Baronet (of Dunburgh); 1901–1928	Succeeded by Charles James Buchanan
