= Mowbray baronets =

Baronetcy in the Baronetage of the United Kingdom

The Mowbray baronetcy, of Warennes Wood, Mortimer, in the County of Berkshire, was a title in the Baronetage of the United Kingdom. It was created on 3 May 1880 for the politician John Mowbray. He served as Judge Advocate General from 1858 to 1859 and from 1866 to 1868. He was Member of Parliament for Oxford University from 1868, and was Father of the House of Commons from 1898 to 1899. Born John Cornish, he had assumed by Royal licence the surname of Mowbray (which was that of his father-in-law) in lieu of his patronymic in 1847.

The 2nd Baronet was also a politician, Member of Parliament for Prestwich from 1886 to 1895 and for Lambeth, Brixton division from 1900 to 1906. The title became extinct on the death of the 6th Baronet on 15 September 2022.

== Mowbray baronets, of Warennes Wood (1880) ==
- Sir John Robert Mowbray, 1st Baronet (1815–1899)
- Sir Robert Gray Cornish Mowbray, 2nd Baronet (1850–1916)
- Sir Reginald Ambrose Mowbray, 3rd Baronet (1852–1916)
- Sir Edmund George Lionel Mowbray, 4th Baronet (1859–1919)
- Sir George Robert Mowbray, 5th Baronet (1899–1969) In 1946, he was fined for importuning men at Piccadilly Circus Underground station.
- Sir John Robert Mowbray, 6th Baronet (1932–2022), left no male heir. He married Lavinia Hugonin, a daughter of Lt Col. Francis Hugonin, and they had three daughters.

Coat of arms of Mowbray of Warennes Wood
Crest 1st, An oak tree Or, pendent from the tree an escutcheon gules charged with a lion’s head erased Argent (Mowbray); 2nd, a Cornish chough between two branches of laurel proper (Cornish). Escutcheon Quarterly, 1st and 4th: Gules, a lion rampant Ermine, two flaunches Or, each charged with three billets in pale Azure (Mowbray); 2nd and 3rd: Per pale Azure and Sable, a chevron embattled, between in chief two roses, and in base a cross pattée Or (Cornish). Motto Suo stat robore virtus (Virtue stands in its own strength); Deus pascit corvos (God feeds the ravens)

Baronetage of the United Kingdom
Preceded by Buchanan baronets	Mowbray baronets of Warennes Wood; 3 May 1880	Succeeded by Campbell baronets
