= St John of Jerusalem's Church =

St John of Jerusalem's Church, Winkburn
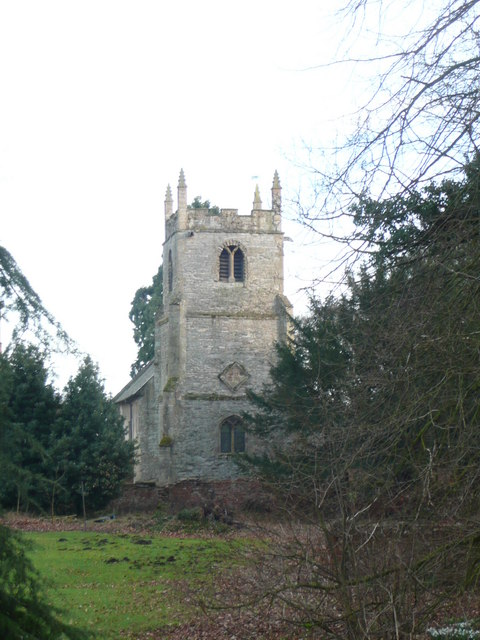
- St John of Jerusalem's Church, Winkburn
- St John of Jerusalem's Church, Winkburn
- 53°7′2.34″N 0°56′16.59″W
- OS grid reference: SK 71174 58310
- Location: Winkburn
- Country: England
- Denomination: Church of England

History
- Dedication: St. John of Jerusalem

Architecture
- Heritage designation: Grade I listed

Administration
- Diocese: Diocese of Southwell and Nottingham
- Archdeaconry: Newark
- Deanery: Newark and Southwell
- Parish: Winkburn

St John of Jerusalem's Church, Winkburn is a Grade I listed parish church in the Church of England in Winkburn.

== History ==
The church was built in the 12th century. The tower was rebuilt in the 17th century, and the church was re-roofed in 1853.

From 1199 to 1832 there was a cell of the Knights Hospitaller based here.

== See also ==
- Grade I listed buildings in Nottinghamshire
- Listed buildings in Winkburn
