= Matthew Jenison =

English Member of Parliament

Sir Matthew Jenison (1654 – 27 Nov 1734) was an English Member of Parliament.

He was the eldest son of apothecary Matthew Jenison of Newark-on-Trent, Nottinghamshire and was educated at Repton School, Christ's College, Cambridge (1672) and trained in the law at Lincoln's Inn in 1674. He succeeded his father in 1681 and was knighted in 1683.

He was appointed High Sheriff of Nottinghamshire for 1683–84 and was MP for Newark from 1701 to 1705.

He never married. He became involved in several lawsuits and was committed to the Fleet Prison for refusing to pay his legal costs in a particular suit, where he died in 1734.
