= James Falshaw =

British railway engineer and politician

Sir James Falshaw JP DL FRSE
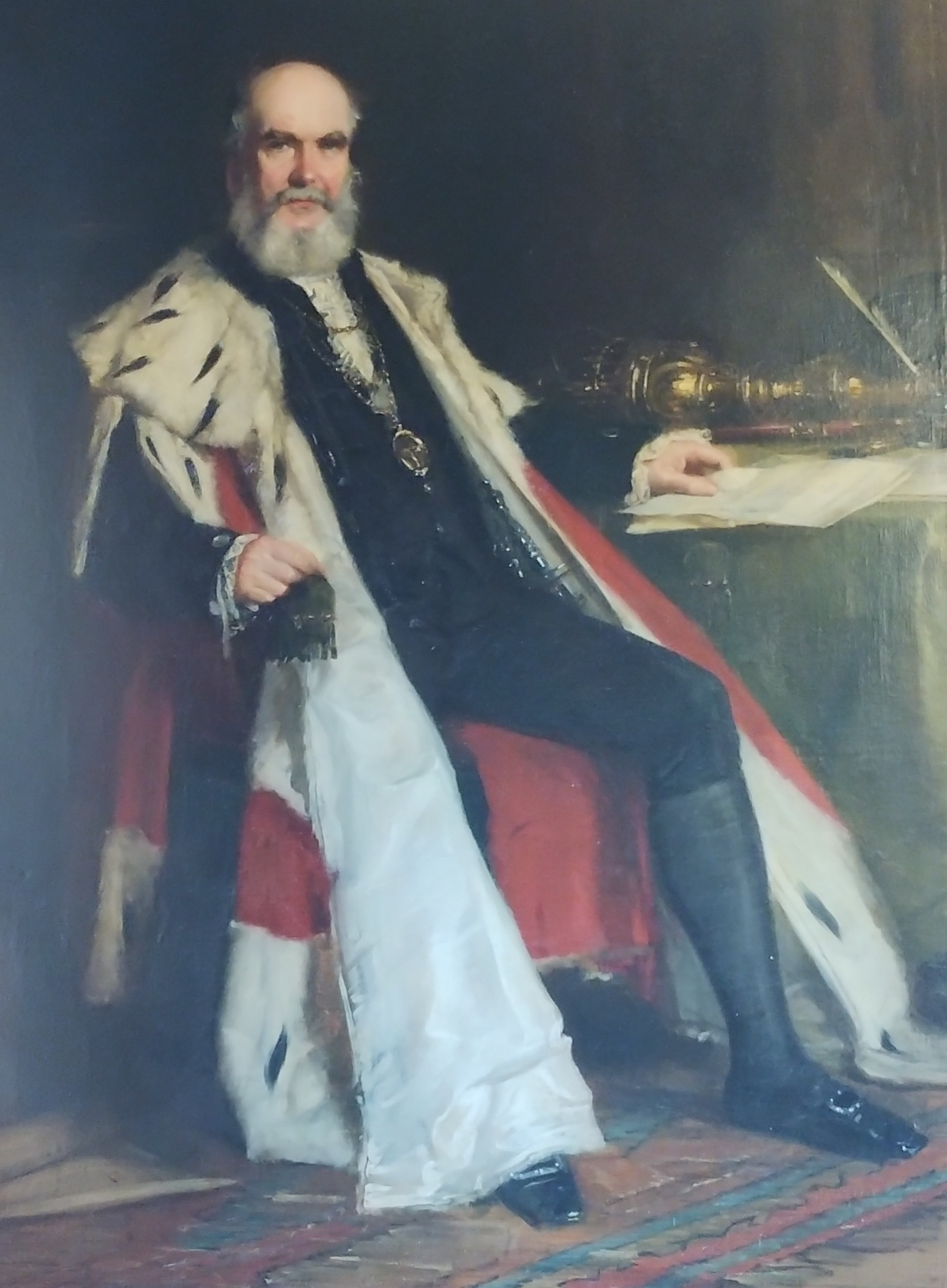
- James Falshaw by Robert Herdman
- Born: 21 March 1810; Leeds, England
- Died: 14 June 1889 (aged 79); Edinburgh, Scotland
- Spouse(s): Anne Morkill; Jane Gibbs

Sir James Falshaw, 1st Baronet JP, DL, FRSE (21 March 1810 – 14 June 1889), was a British railway engineer and politician.

== Life ==
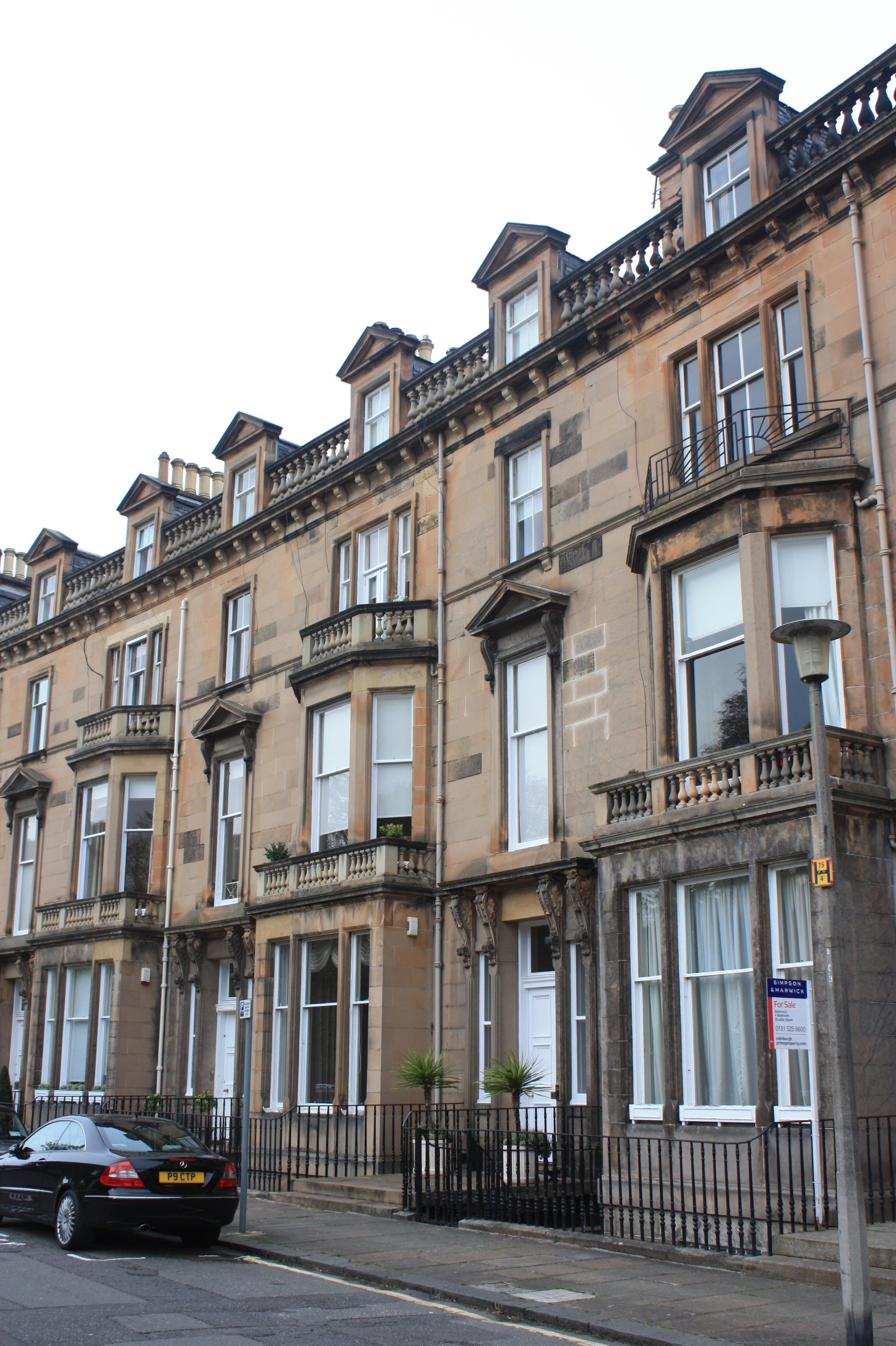
Falshaw's house at 14 Belgrave Crescent, Edinburgh

Falshaw was born in Leeds, of an "old yeoman family" and was the son of William Falshaw, wool merchant, and Hannah Shaw. He was the sixth of fourteen children. His grandfather, George, came from Coverdale in the North Riding of Yorkshire.

In youth he studied under Jonathan Lockwood and then, aged 14, he was articled to the architect and surveyor, Joseph Cusworth, and trained as an engineer and surveyor. There he befriended John Hawkshaw (later Sir John Hawkshaw).

In 1836, he went to work for George Leather, an engineer. Here he worked on Leeds Waterworks situated in Eccup. From 1837 to 1841, he worked on the Stockton and Hartlepool railway line and began to specialise in that field of work. The most impressive structure on this line was the 92-arch brick viaduct over Greatham Marsh. From 1838 to 1844, he also worked on the Bradford Waterworks.

In June 1844, he moved to Kendal to oversee the construction of the Lancaster and Carlisle Railway. In 1845, he acted as an advisor to the House of Commons on various forthcoming railway projects. In 1845, he moved to Stirling to oversee the building of the Caledonian Railway. This project involved joining to the existing Edinburgh to Glasgow line at Greenhill and extending a 100-mile line (most of which was double track) in a broad loop via Stirling and Dunblane to reach Forfar. The most impressive part of this is the mile-long Moncrieff Tunnel. This was completed by 1848.

His first wife, Anne Morkill, died in April 1864 and is buried in Whitkirk in Yorkshire.

In 1871, he married Jane Gibbs (b.1825) at the Wesleyan Methodist Chapel, Nicholson Square, Edinburgh. From 1882 to 1887 he was chairman of the North British Railway Company. He was the inaugural Honorary Vice-President of Edinburgh Choral Union (later Edinburgh Royal Choral Union) from 1874 to 1887.

Falshaw was Lord Provost of Edinburgh between 1874 and 1877. His Town Clerk was William Skinner of Corra.

Escutcheon of the Falshaw baronets of Belgrave Crescent

He was created a baronet, of Belgrave Crescent in the City of Edinburgh, on 6 September 1876. He died at home, 14 Belgrave Crescent, in western Edinburgh in June 1889, aged 79, when the baronetcy became extinct.

He is buried close to his home, in Dean Cemetery, Edinburgh and has a marble monument and ornament over his grave. He is buried with both wives, including his second wife, Jane Gibbs, Lady Falshaw (d.1889). The grave lies on the main east-west path of the northern extension to the original cemetery.

== Memorials ==
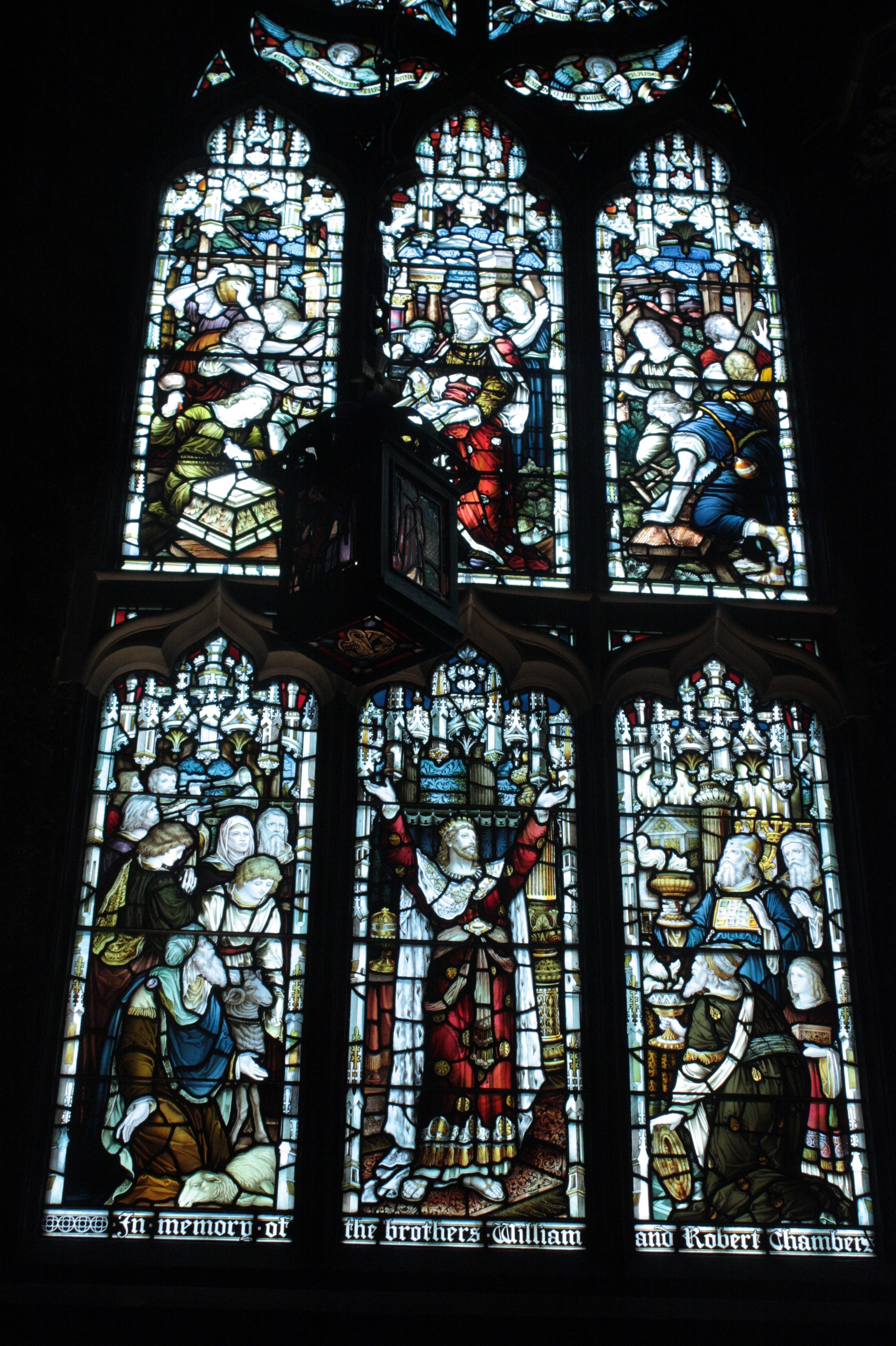
James Falshaw memorial window, St Giles Cathedral, Edinburgh

The main east window in St. Giles Cathedral is dedicated to James Falshaw.

Falshaw Bridge crossing the Water of Leith in Stockbridge, Edinburgh has a plaque to Falshaw.

What is now called Iona Street, east of Leith Walk was originally planned as Falshaw Street but this name only survived for ten years.

== Depictions in art ==
A full-length portrait of Falshaw by Robert Herdman RSA hangs in the Old Council Chamber (now known as the Diamond Jubilee Room) in Edinburgh City Chambers.

A marble bust by John Hutchison stands in the Merchants Hall in Edinburgh.

Political offices
Preceded by James Cowan	Lord Provost of Edinburgh; 1874–1877	Succeeded by Sir Thomas Jamieson Boyd
Baronetage of the United Kingdom
New creation	Baronet (of Belgrave Crescent); 1876–1889	Extinct
Preceded by Temple baronets	Falshaw baronets of Belgrave Crescent; 6 September 1876	Succeeded by Milne baronets
