= Milne baronets =

Set index for Milne baronets

There have been two baronetcies for the surname Milne, one in the Baronetage of Nova Scotia and one in the Baronetage of the United Kingdom. Both are extinct.

- Milne baronets of Barnton (1686)
- Milne baronets of Inveresk (1876)
