= George Parkins =

Member of the Parliament of England

Sir George Parkins (c. 1576 – 23 August 1626) was an English Member of Parliament.

He was the eldest son of Richard Parkins of Bunny, Nottinghamshire and trained in the law at the Inner Temple (1587), being called to the bar in 1598. He succeeded his father in 1603 and was knighted the same year.

He was appointed Captain of Walmer Castle for 1601–1609 and High Sheriff of Nottinghamshire for 1613–14. He was elected MP for Leicester in 1597.

He married Mary, the daughter and heiress of Edward Isham of Walmer Castle, Kent with whom he had 4 sons and 3 daughters. He was succeeded by his son Isham, although his wife's Kent estates went to their daughter Mary.
