= Listed buildings in Winkburn =

Winkburn is a civil parish in the Newark and Sherwood district of Nottinghamshire, England. The parish contains seven listed buildings that are recorded in the National Heritage List for England. Of these, two are listed at Grade I, the highest of the three grades, and the others are at Grade II, the lowest grade. The parish contains the village of Winkburn and the surrounding area. All the listed buildings are in the village, and consist of a church, a country house and its associated stable block, lodge and ice house, a former school and a farmhouse.

== Key ==
Grade	Criteria
I	Buildings of exceptional interest, sometimes considered to be internationally important
II	Buildings of national importance and special interest

== Buildings ==
Name and location	Photograph	Date	Notes	Grade
St John of Jerusalem's Church; 53.11726°N 0.93801°W		12th century	The church has been altered and extended through the centuries. It is built in stone, mainly rendered, with slate roofs, and consists of a nave, a south porch, a chancel and a west tower. The tower has three stages, a plinth, diagonal buttresses, bands, and an embattled parapet with four crocketed pinnacles. On the west side is a two-light arched window, on the north side is a rectangular window, above which is a recessed panel with an inscription and a decorative surround, and the bell openings have two-lights and decorated surrounds. The porch is gabled, and has an arched entrance with a chamfered surround, imposts and a hood mould, and the inner doorway, which dates from the 12th century, has beakhead decoration.	I
Winkburn Hall and wall 53.11750°N 0.93770°W		Late 17th century	A country house in red brick on a rusticated stone plinth, with stone dressings, quoins, a floor band, a modillion cornice with a band, a parapet and a hipped slate roof. There are three storeys and seven bays, the outer two bays at each end projecting, forming an H-shaped plan. In the centre is a single-storey three-bay porch with four Tuscan columns, behind which are four pilasters, an entablature, and a doorway with a fanlight. The windows in the lower two floors are sashes, and in the top floor they are casements. Attached to the right is a two-bay wing, and at the rear is a three-bay service wing. Projecting from the right of the hall is a red brick wall with stone coping.	I
Home Farmhouse; 53.11865°N 0.94012°W		c. 1700	The farmhouse is in red brick, with floor bands, dentilled and dogtooth eaves, and a tile roof. There are two storeys and three bays, and a two-storey two-bay rear wing on a partial plinth. On the front are casement windows under segmental arches.	II
The Old School; 53.11820°N 0.93920°W		1738	The house, originally a school and a house, is in red brick, partly whitewashed, with dentilled eaves and a tile roof. There are two storeys and attics, and five bays, the outer bays gabled, with floor bands, bargeboards and finials. The middle bay projects slightly, it is flanked by rusticated pilasters, it has a gabled open porch, and above it is a plaque. The outer bays contain horizontally-sliding sash windows under segmental arches, the other windows are casements, and in the attic are two gabled dormers.	II
Stable block, Winkburn Hall; 53.11786°N 0.93784°W		Late 18th century	The stable block is in red brick with a rendered floor band and a hipped slate roof. There are two storeys and seven bays. On the roof is a square clock tower, with three clock faces, and a wooden cupola with a pyramidal roof. The block contains a central segmental-arched doorway and casement windows.	II
Ice house 53.11596°N 0.93848°W	—	Mid 19th century	The ice house in the grounds of Winkburn Hall is in red brick. It has a central doorway and a domed storage chamber.	II
Winkburn Hall Lodge; 53.11793°N 0.94043°W		Mid 19th century	The lodge is in red brick on a chamfered stone plinth, with stone dressings, quoins, and a fishscale tile roof with shaped stone coped gables and kneelers. There is a single storey, an irregular cruciform plan, and four bays. The doorway and the windows, which are casements, are arched and have quoined surrounds. In a gable apex is a stone shield in a stone panel.	II
