= Berkeley Milne =

Royal Navy Admiral (1855–1938)

Admiral Sir Berkeley Milne Bt GCVO KCB
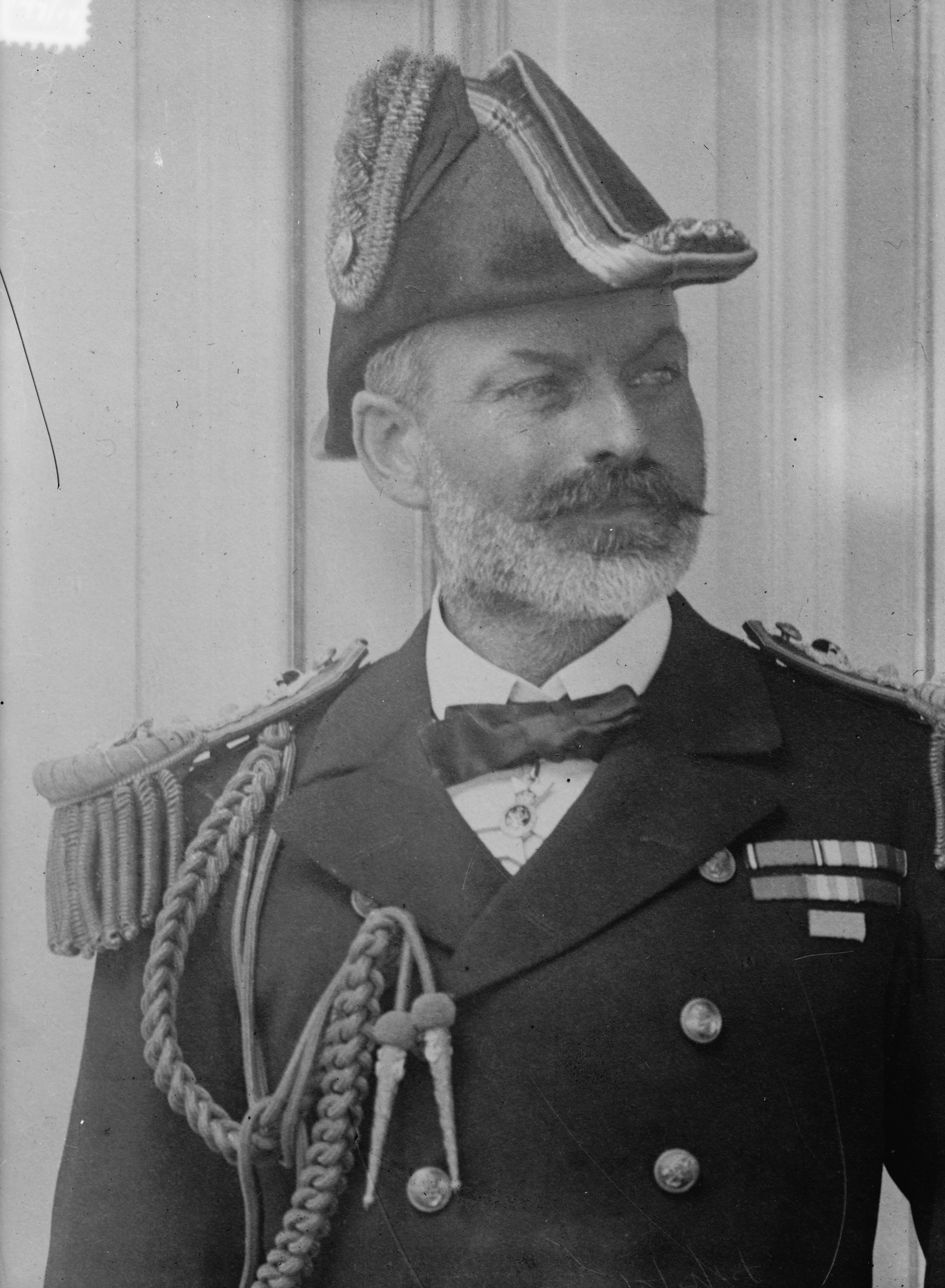
- Milne in 1910
- Born: 2 June 1855
- Died: 4 July 1938 (aged 83)
- Military career
- Allegiance: United Kingdom
- Branch: Royal Navy
- Rank: Admiral
- Commands: HMY Osborne; HMS Venus; HMS Jupiter; H.M. Yachts; 2nd Div, Home Fleet; Mediterranean Fleet
- Conflicts: Anglo-Zulu War; World War I
- Awards: Knight Grand Cross of the Royal Victorian Order; Knight Commander of the Order of the Bath

Admiral Sir Archibald Berkeley Milne, 2nd Baronet, GCVO, KCB (2 June 1855 – 4 July 1938) was a senior Royal Navy officer who commanded the Mediterranean Fleet at the outbreak of the First World War.

== Naval career ==
Milne was the son of distinguished admiral Sir Alexander Milne, 1st Baronet, and grandson of Vice-Admiral Sir David Milne. In 1879 he became aide-de-camp to Lord Chelmsford during the Zulu Wars, being fortunate enough to have been separated from the main army at the time of the massacre of British forces at the Battle of Isandlwana on 22 January 1879.

In 1891 with the rank of captain he accepted command of HMY Osborne, despite the normal rank for the officer in charge of such a ship being only 'commander'. While some officers only accepted short postings to royal yachts, fearing the effect on their careers of sinecure postings, Milne regarded it as a career path to flag rank. After a regular command of the cruiser Venus, which served on the Mediterranean Station, he was in December 1900 appointed in command of the pre-dreadnought battleship HMS Jupiter, of the Channel Fleet. In October 1902, he was appointed a Naval Aide-de-Camp to the King. He was back in royal service when he became flag officer commanding H. M. Yachts from April 1903 to 1905, being promoted to rear admiral on 25 April 1904. During this time, he became a friend of King Edward VII and of Queen Alexandra, who called him "Arky-Barky". His hobbies were described as collecting rare orchids and entertaining royal ladies. Milne enjoyed the formal atmosphere of service in the royal squadron, with its emphasis on ceremony, spit and polish.

His next posting was as second in command of the Atlantic Fleet until 1906. From 1908 to 1910 Milne commanded the 2nd Division of the Home Fleets. Milne was made a full Admiral in 1911 and made Commander-in-Chief, Mediterranean Fleet in November 1912. The appointment was made by Winston Churchill, First Lord of the Admiralty, taking into consideration the views of King George V. Admiral Fisher, former First Sea Lord deplored Milne's appointment to such an important post, accusing Churchill of having betrayed the navy. At the outset of the First World War, the Mediterranean Fleet consisted of three dreadnought battle cruisers, four large armoured cruisers, four light cruisers and 16 destroyers.

== The pursuit of Goeben and Breslau ==
On 4 August 1914, after Germany had declared war on Russia and France but before Great Britain had declared war on Germany, Milne sent his two strongest battlecruisers, HMS Indomitable and Indefatigable, to seek out (as ordered) Germany's only two ships in the Mediterranean, SMS Goeben and Breslau, under the command of Admiral Wilhelm Souchon. The ships met as the Germans were steaming back to Messina, Italy, to refuel after bombarding the French colonial ports of Philippeville and Bône, Algeria.

The German ships steamed out of Messina harbour at midnight, 5 August, precisely as Britain officially went to war with Germany. They were headed for Turkey, to attempt to convince it to enter the war on Germany's side, by force if necessary. The heading surprised Admiral Milne who had expected them to steam west to the Straits of Gibraltar. He had only one ship, the light cruiser HMS Gloucester, in a position to follow them. The next morning (7 August), Gloucester closed in and opened fire on Breslau, which returned fire. Breslau was slightly damaged in the exchange receiving one hit at the waterline. Near the western coast of Greece, the pursuit of Goeben and Breslau was taken up by four more British ships, led by Milne's second-in-command, Rear-Admiral Sir Ernest Charles Thomas Troubridge. Troubridge's ships (the cruisers HMS Defence, Black Prince, Warrior and Duke of Edinburgh) were smaller and slower than Goeben; they were also substantially outgunned, and much less well-armoured. Troubridge and his gunnery officer determined they could not intercept the German ships before daylight. They concluded that the enemy battlecruiser's superior speed and range would allow it to maintain enough distance to pick off Troubridge's ships at leisure before they could ever get close enough to engage effectively.

Souchon's ships made it to Constantinople and were admitted into the harbour by the Turks. The German diplomats reminded the Turks that Great Britain had recently broken a contract to supply two new battleships to the Turkish government (which the British Admiralty had decided to keep for its own use as war loomed), and offered to sell them Goeben and Breslau. The Turks agreed on 16 August and eventually joined Germany's side on 30 October 1914. The ships were renamed Yavuz Sultan Selim and Midili, retaining their German crews; Souchon was made commander-in-chief of the Turkish Navy.

== Aftermath ==
Afterwards, Milne served out the rest of the war on half-pay. He was offered the three-year command at the Nore encompassing the ports of Chatham and Sheerness in 1916, but the position eventually went to another officer due to "other exigencies". The Admiralty repeatedly emphasised that Milne had been exonerated of all blame in the affair, most significantly when announcing Milne's retirement at his own request in 1919, so as to further the promotion of other officers. In 1920 the official naval history of the war by Sir Julian Corbett was critical of Milne's handling of the affair; Milne claimed that "the book contained serious inaccuracies". Milne requested the Admiralty to act which they declined to do so, and in 1921 Milne wrote The Flight of the Goeben and the Breslau in an attempt to clear his name, which "justified the official approbation".

== Sources ==
- Robert Massie, Castles of Steel, Random House 2004, ISBN 0-224-04092-8
- Geoffrey Miller, Superior Force: The conspiracy behind the escape of Goeben and Breslau, pub Hull, 1996, ISBN 0-85958-635-9
- Dan van der Vat, The Ship that Changed the World: The Escape of the Goeben to the Dardanelles in 1914, Bethesda, MD, Adler & Adler, 1986.
- Admiral Sir A. Berkeley Milne, Bt., The Flight of Goeben and Breslau: An Episode in Naval History, London, Eveleigh Nash Company, 1921.
- Andrew Gordon (1996). The Rules of the Game: Jutland and British Naval Command. London: John Murray.

Military offices
Preceded by Sir Edmund Poë	Commander-in-Chief, Mediterranean Fleet; 1912–1914	Vacant Title next held by Sir Somerset Gough-Calthorpe
Baronetage of the United Kingdom
Preceded by Alexander Milne	Baronet (of Inveresk); 1896–1938	Extinct
