= Milne baronets of Barnton (1686) =

Escutcheon of the Milne baronets of Barnton

The Milne baronetcy, of Barnton, Dumfries, was a title in the Baronetage of Nova Scotia. It was created on 19 March 1686 for Robert Milne or Mylne with remainder to his heirs male whatsoever, by James II and VII. Milne had purchased Barnton in 1680, but money troubles led him to sell it, before 1698.

On the death of the 2nd Baronet in 1791, the baronetcy became either extinct or dormant.

== Milne baronets, of Barnton (1686) ==
- Sir Robert Milne, 1st Baronet
- Sir John Milne, supposed grandson and 2nd Baronet (c.1701–1791).

As Sir John Mylne, the 2nd Baronet is known as Lieutenant-Governor in the Channel Islands, in the 1750s. In June 1755, as acting Commander-in-Chief on Guernsey, he met the visiting Governor John West, 1st Earl De La Warr (John Myln in report). His action in seizing in May 1756 a Swedish vessel bound for Saint-Malo led to a dispute with the Royal Court of Guernsey.

In 1757 Mylne wrote to John Clevland of the Admiralty describing dangers to Guernsey from French forces, and the dearth of local militia. He commanded a company of the Corps of Invalids on Guernsey from 1762. At the end of his life, he was captain of the garrison at Cowes Castle. He died in Brompton Grove, Old Brompton, aged 89.
