= Winkburn Hall =

Grade I listed hall in Nottinghamshire, England

Coordinates: 53.1174°N 0.9377°W

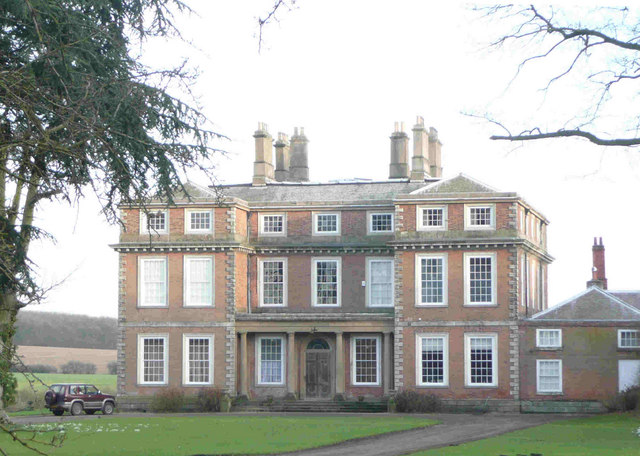
Winkburn Hall

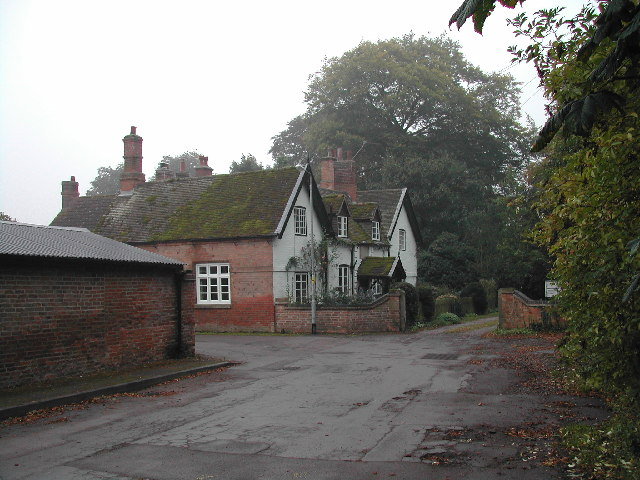
The north lodge and the entrance to Winkburn Hall

Winkburn Hall is a Grade I listed country house which stands at the corner of an estate a few miles north-east of Southwell, Nottinghamshire, off the Hockerton to Kirklington road. It was built for the Burnell family circa 1700 as a two-storey mansion in red brick with ashlar dressing and a hipped slate roof. The original mansard roof has since been converted to an additional third storey.

== History ==
Under the Normans Winkburn manor belonged to the De Tyson family until Adam de Tyson conveyed the manor to the Knights Hospitaller of St. John of Jerusalem who held it until the Dissolution of the Monasteries. It was then promised by the crown to London merchant Thomas Burnell in exchange for land in Surrey, but because he died soon afterwards it went to his son William instead. The Burnells lived at the hall for nine generations during which time the present house was built around 1700 to replace the original manor house.

After the death of Darcy Burnell in 1774 several parties claimed ownership but the courts ruled that the estate belonged jointly to two descendants, Peter Pegge of Beauchief Abbey, who adopted the surname Burnell, and Richard Bristowe, who also adopted the surname Burnell. After Richard Bristowe Burnell died his widow sold her half ownership to Peter Pegge Burnall. He died childless in 1836 and was succeeded by Broughton Steade, who assumed the surname of Pegge-Burnell. His descendants held the property until 1931, when it passed to Assheton Craven Smith-Milnes, a descendant of a daughter of Broughton Pegge Burnell. During the Second World War the Nottingham Dolphin School were moved there.

Richard Craven-Smith-Milne, a former High Sheriff of Nottinghamshire is the present incumbent. The hall is also the head office of the food company he ran with his late wife Jane (1941-2019), which trades as The Country Victualler.

== See also ==
- Grade I listed buildings in Nottinghamshire
- Listed buildings in Winkburn
