= Francis Hugonin =

English cricketer and soldier

Personal information
- Full name: Francis Edgar Hugonin
- Born: 16 August 1897; Kensington, London, England
- Died: 5 March 1967 (aged 69); Yorkshire, England
- Batting: Right-handed
- Role: Wicket-keeper

Domestic team information
- Years: Team
- 1927–1928: Essex
- 1930–1937: Army
- FC debut: 22 June 1927 Essex v Oxford University
- Last FC: 29 May 1937 Army v Cambridge University

Career statistics
Competition	First-class
Matches	14
Runs scored	167
Batting average	12.84
100s/50s	0/0
Top score	44
Catches/stumpings	26/6
- Source: CricketArchive, 29 December 2007

Francis Edgar Hugonin OBE (16 August 1897 – 5 March 1967) was an English soldier and cricketer. A right-handed batsman and wicket-keeper, he played first-class cricket for the British Army and also for Essex in 1927 and 1928. He rose to the rank of lieutenant colonel in the Royal Artillery and saw active service in the Second World War, during much of which he was a prisoner of war.

== Life ==
Born in Kensington in 1897, Hugonin became a career soldier after training at the Royal Military Academy, Woolwich, and was commissioned into the Royal Artillery on 15 October 1915. By the 1930s he was married with children, and in 1937 he travelled to India with his family on the ship Dilwarra. He was posted to Singapore in January 1939 with the 3rd Heavy Anti-Aircraft Artillery, and became a prisoner of war of the Japanese in February 1942 at the Fall of Singapore, during the Second World War. In September 1946, when he held the rank of acting lieutenant colonel, he was appointed an Officer of the Order of the British Empire for his gallant war service as a prisoner of war, during which he had shown great defiance of the Japanese, had destroyed enemy equipment, and had defended his men, even to the extent of taking beatings for others. He managed to play first-class cricket during the middle years of his Army service.

After the war, Hugonin became a Justice of the Peace. He died in Yorkshire in 1967.

== Cricketing career ==
Hugonin made his first-class cricket debut in 1927, when he played for Essex against Oxford University. The following year, he played again for Essex against the touring West Indians before playing four County Championship matches. A match against Sussex was his last for Essex.

After playing for the Marylebone Cricket Club (MCC) in a match against Ireland in 1929, he returned to first-class cricket in 1930, playing for the Army against the Royal Air Force. He played against the RAF again the following year, also playing against Oxford University. He played for the Army against the West Indies in 1933.

In 1935, he played a Minor Counties Championship match for Berkshire against Hertfordshire, also playing a first-class match for the Army against Cambridge University the same year.

He played against Cambridge University again in 1936, before his final two first-class games came in 1937, for the Army against Oxford University and Cambridge University. In 1940, he played once for the Straits Settlements against the Federated Malay States.

== Marriage and children ==
On 29 October 1925, Francis Hugonin married Joan Mary Pennyman, the elder daughter of the Rev. William Geoffrey Pennyman, Vicar of St Mark's, North Audley Street, Westminster. They had three children, William Francis Pennyman (born 1926), David Christian (born 1928), and Lavinia Mary (1936-2020).

In 1949 their son William married Daphne Marjorie Oldham, and they later had a son and two daughters. In 1952 David Christian married Delia Loftus, and they had a daughter in 1953 and three sons (triplets) in 1954. In 1957 Lavinia Mary married Sir John Mowbray, 6th Baronet, and they had three daughters.
