= Sir Alexander Milne, 1st Baronet =

Royal Navy Admiral of the Fleet (1806–1896)

Admiral of the Fleet Sir Alexander Milne Bt GCB
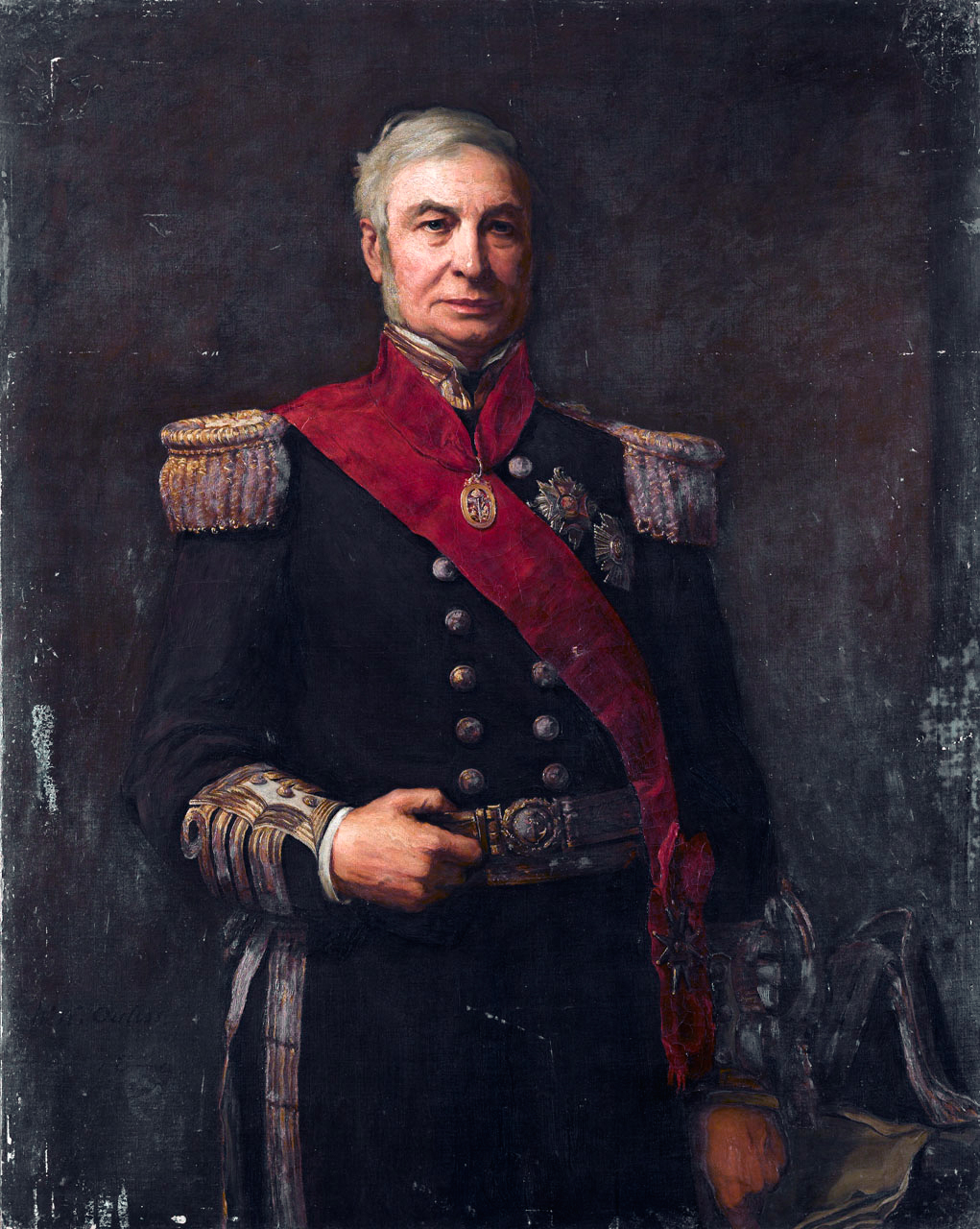
- Portrait of Milne by Walter William Ouless (1879)
- Born: 10 November 1806; Inveresk, Scotland
- Died: 29 December 1896 (aged 90); Inveresk, Scotland
- Military career
- Allegiance: United Kingdom
- Branch: Royal Navy
- Service years: 1817–1876
- Rank: Admiral of the Fleet
- Commands: HMS Crocodile; HMS Cleopatra; HMS Caledonia; HMS St Vincent; North America and West Indies Station; Mediterranean Fleet
- Conflicts: Crimean War
- Awards: Knight Grand Cross of the Order of the Bath (military division); Knight Commander of the Order of the Bath (civil division); Milne baronetcy

Admiral of the Fleet Sir Alexander Milne, 1st Baronet, GCB (10 November 1806 – 29 December 1896) was a Royal Navy officer. As a captain on the North America and West Indies Station he was employed capturing slave-traders and carrying out fishery protection duties. He served as a Junior Naval Lord under both Liberal and Conservative administrations and was put in charge of organising British and French transports during the Crimean War. He became Commander-in-Chief, North America and West Indies Station and in this role he acted with diplomacy, especially in response to the Trent Affair on 8 November 1861 during the American Civil War, when USS San Jacinto, commanded by Union Captain Charles Wilkes, intercepted the British mail packet RMS Trent and removed, as contraband of war, two Confederate diplomats, James Mason and John Slidell. He became First Naval Lord in the third Derby–Disraeli ministry in July 1866 and in this role took advantage of the Government's focus on spending reduction to ask fundamental questions about naval strategy. He again became First Naval Lord in the first Gladstone ministry in November 1872, remaining in office under the second Disraeli ministry and identifying the critical need for trade protection at times of war and demanding new cruisers to protect British merchant shipping.

== Early career ==
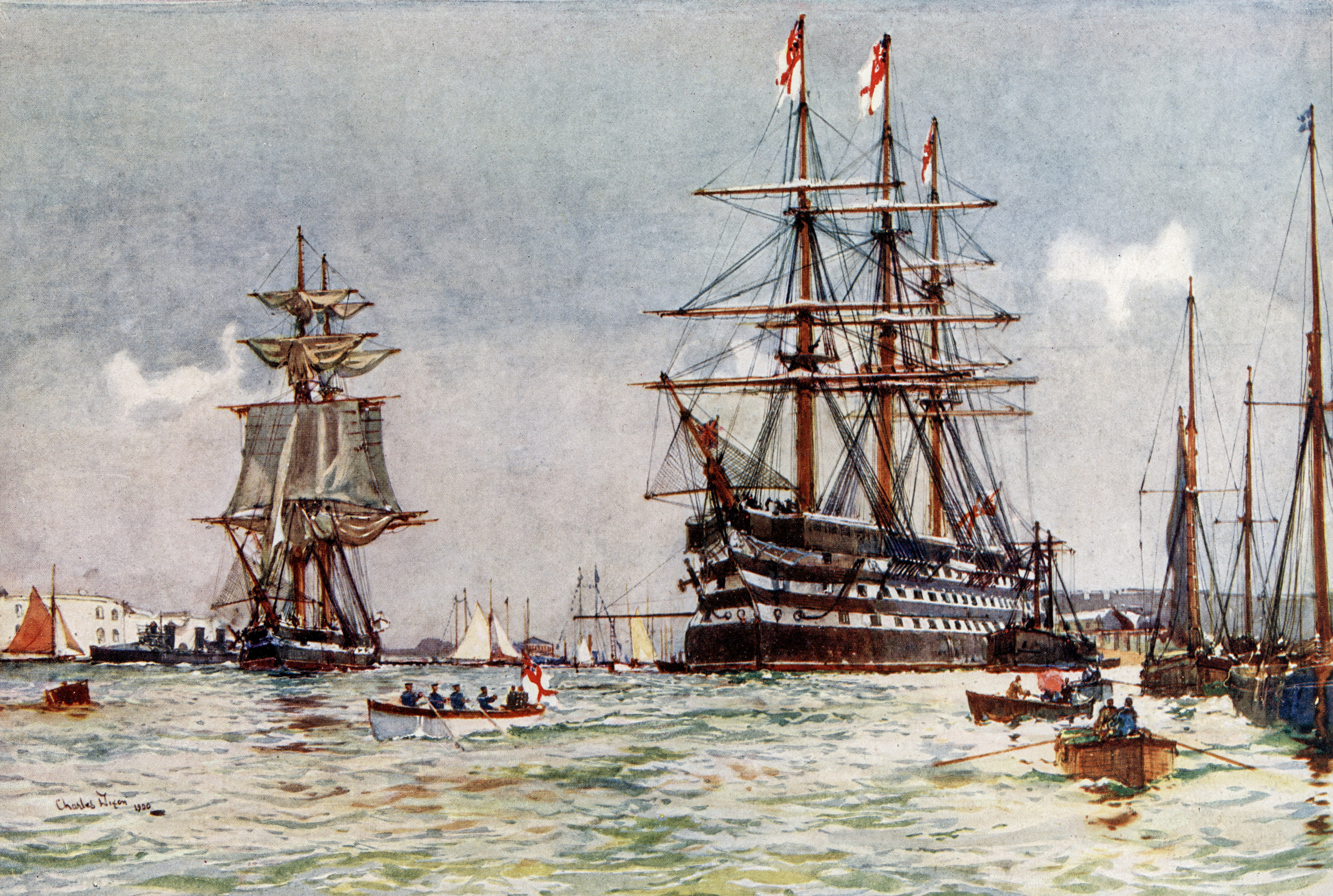
The first-rate HMS St Vincent which Milne commanded, by Charles Dixon

Milne was born the second son of the Admiral Sir David Milne and Grace Milne (daughter of Sir Alexander Purves, Bt). His older brother David was later known as David Milne-Home.

His father purchased 10 York Place, Edinburgh in 1814 and the family lived there.

Milne joined the Royal Navy in February 1817. After initial training at the Royal Navy College at Portsmouth he joined his father's flagship, the fourth-rate HMS Leander, on the North American Station in 1819. Over the next few years he served in the sixth-rate HMS Conway, third-rate HMS Ramillies, second-rate HMS Ganges and third-rate HMS Albion. He became an acting lieutenant in the sloop HMS Cadmus on the coast of Brazil in June 1827 and was promoted to the substantive rank of lieutenant on 8 September 1827. Promoted to commander on 25 November 1830, he joined the sloop HMS Snake on the West Indies Station in December 1836 and was employed capturing slave-traders.

Promoted to captain on 30 January 1839, Milne was given command of the sixth-rate HMS Crocodile on the North America and West Indies Station and employed carrying out fishery protection duties before becoming Captain of the sixth-rate HMS Cleopatra also on the North America and West Indies Station in November 1840. In HMS Cleopatra he was employed both capturing slave-traders and carrying out fishery protection duties. He became Flag-captain in the first-rate HMS Caledonia to his father, who was then serving as Commander-in-Chief, Plymouth, in April 1842 and Flag-captain in the first-rate HMS St Vincent to Sir Charles Ogle, who was then serving as Commander-in-Chief, Portsmouth, in October 1846.

Milne became Fourth Naval Lord in the first Russell ministry in December 1847, Fifth Naval Lord in the first Derby ministry in March 1852 and Fourth Naval Lord in the Aberdeen ministry in January 1853, when he was put in charge of organising British and French transports during the Crimean War. He became Third Naval Lord in the first Palmerston ministry in November 1857.

== Senior command ==
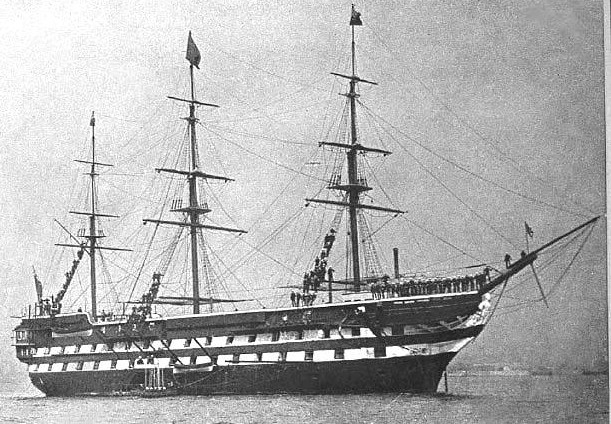
The second-rate HMS Nile, Milne's flagship when he commanded the North America and West Indies Station in the early 1860s

Promoted to rear-admiral on 20 January 1858 and appointed Knight Commander of the Order of the Bath (Civil) on 20 December 1858, Milne became Fourth Naval Lord in the second Derby–Disraeli ministry in April 1859. During his service at the Admiralty from December 1847 to June 1859 he served under four different First Lords of the Admiralty in three Liberal and two Conservative administrations.

Milne became Commander-in-Chief, North America and West Indies Station, hoisting his flag in the second-rate HMS Nile, in January 1860: in this role he acted with diplomacy, especially in response to the Trent Affair on 8 November 1861 during the American Civil War, when USS San Jacinto, commanded by Union Captain Charles Wilkes, intercepted the British mail packet RMS Trent and removed, as contraband of war, two Confederate diplomats, James Mason and John Slidell. Milne was appointed Knight Commander of the Order of the Bath (Military) on 25 February 1864 and promoted to vice-admiral on 13 April 1865.

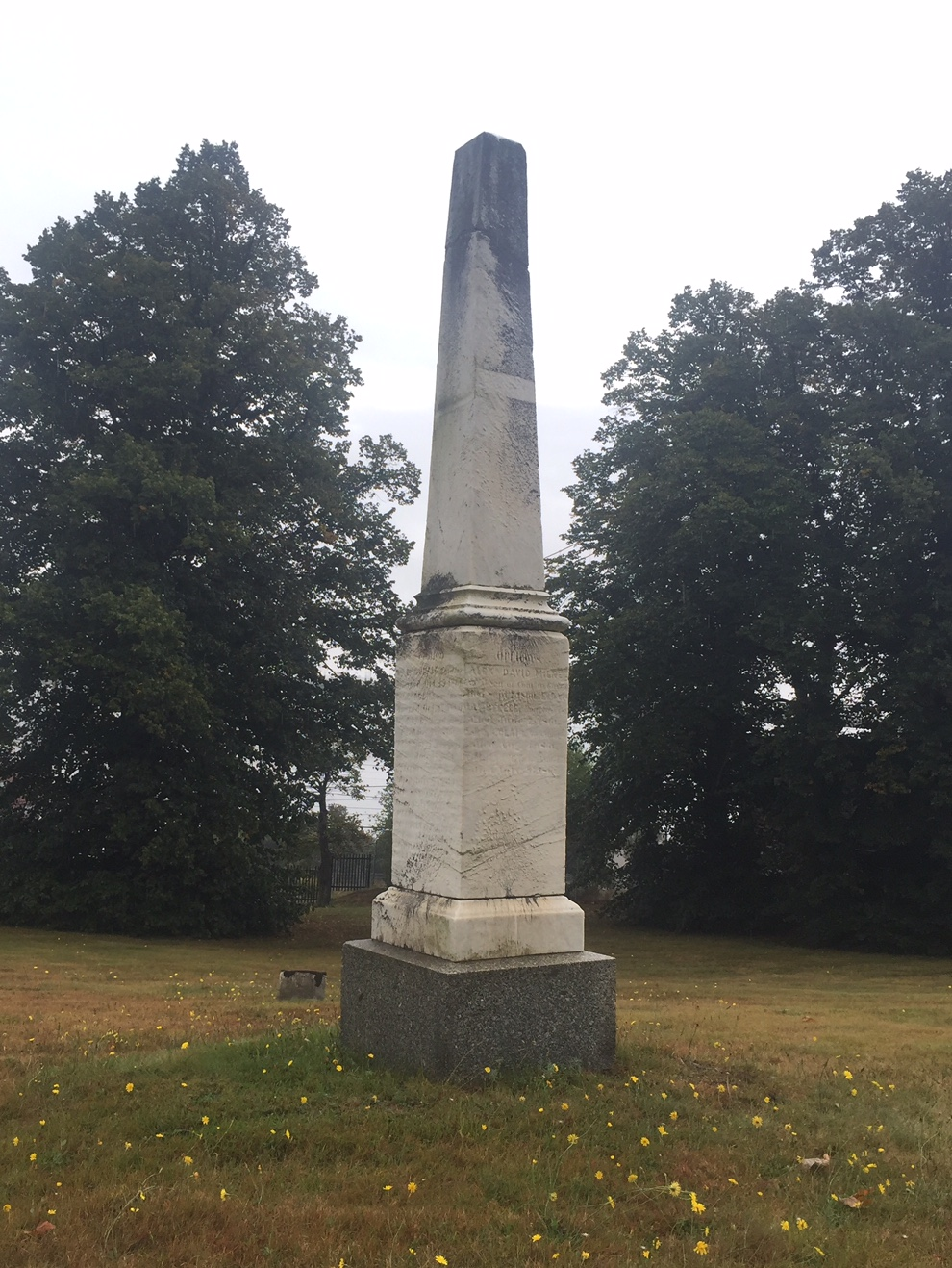
Monument erected by Milne to his son and 14 other crew that died on HMS Nile at Halifax, Royal Navy Burying Ground (Halifax, Nova Scotia)

Milne became First Naval Lord in the third Derby ministry in July 1866 and in this role took advantage of the Government's focus on spending reduction to ask fundamental questions about naval strategy. He remained in office until the Derby ministry fell from power 18 months later.

He became Commander-in-Chief, Mediterranean, hoisting his flag in the battleship HMS Lord Warden, in April 1869. He was promoted to full admiral on 1 April 1870 and advanced to Knight Grand Cross of the Order of the Bath on 20 May 1871. "In the autumn of 1870 the Mediterranean Squadron, under the command of Sir Alexander Milne joined up with the Channel Squadron for the purpose of carrying out combined manoeuvres off the coast of Portugal, and Sir Alexander, being the senior admiral, took supreme command. The low freeboard, fully rigged turret-ship Captain had joined the Channel Squadron a short time before, and the combined fleet put to sea from Vigo". On 6 September "the fleet was sailing in two columns on the starboard tack in a fresh north-west breeze, and Sir Alexander Milne went on board the Captain in the afternoon to inspect her and see how she behaved at sea, as she was a novelty... During the time the Commander-in-Chief was on board the Captain the wind and sea had increased, and he had great difficulty in getting back to his own ship – the Lord Warden. In fact, the captain of the Captain (Hugh Burgoyne) tried to persuade him not to risk it, but to remain on board for the night and return in the morning. Sir Alexander, however, was a dour auld Scotsman and said he would get back to his ship, and did." That night the Captain capsized and sank and "only the gunner and seventeen men were saved."

He again became First Naval Lord in the first Gladstone ministry in November 1872, remaining in office under the second Disraeli ministry and identifying the critical need for trade protection at times of War and demanding new cruisers to protect British merchant shipping. He retired from office in September 1876 and was created a baronet on 26 October 1876.

In retirement he was a member of the Royal Commission Appointed to Enquire into the Defence of British Possessions and Commerce Abroad. Promoted to Admiral of the Fleet on 10 June 1881, he lived at Inveresk House in Inveresk where he died from pneumonia on 29 December 1896. He was buried in Inveresk churchyard on 2 January 1897: the grave lies on the north edge of the original churchyard, near the north-west corner.

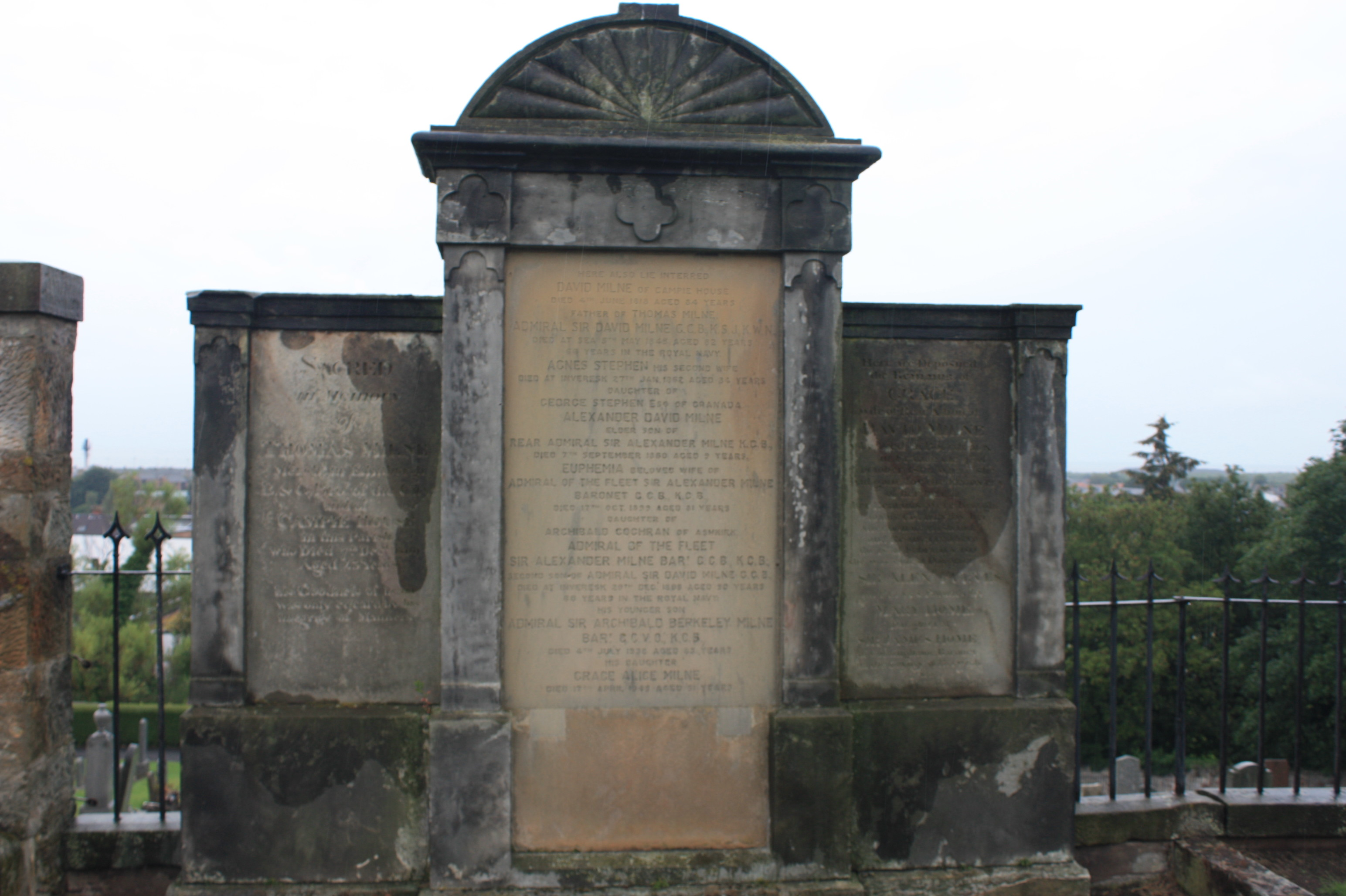
Admiral Milne's family grave, Inveresk

== Family ==
In 1850 he married Euphemia Cochran (d.1889). They had two daughters and one son (Archibald Berkeley Milne).

== See also ==
- O'Byrne, William Richard (1849). "Milne, Alexander" . A Naval Biographical Dictionary . John Murray – via Wikisource.

== Sources ==
- Heathcote, Tony (2002). The British Admirals of the Fleet 1734 - 1995. Pen & Sword Ltd. ISBN 0-85052-835-6.
- William Loney RN Career History
- Laughton, John Knox (1901). "Milne, Alexander" . In Lee, Sidney (ed.). Dictionary of National Biography (1st supplement). London: Smith, Elder & Co.

Military offices
Preceded by Lord John Hay	Fourth Naval Lord; 1847–1852	Succeeded by Arthur Duncombe
Preceded by Arthur Duncombe	Fourth Naval Lord; 1853–1857	Succeeded by Sir Frederick Pelham
Preceded by Henry Eden	Third Naval Lord; 1857–1859	Succeeded by Sir Henry Leeke
Preceded by Sir Swynfen Carnegie	Fourth Naval Lord; April 1859 – June 1859	Succeeded by Charles Frederick
Preceded by Sir Houston Stewart	Commander-in-Chief, North America and West Indies Station; 1860–1864	Succeeded by Sir James Hope
Preceded by Sir Frederick Grey	First Naval Lord; 1866–1868	Succeeded by Sir Sydney Dacres
Preceded by Lord Clarence Paget	Commander-in-Chief, Mediterranean Fleet; 1869–1870	Succeeded by Sir Hastings Yelverton
Preceded by Sir Sydney Dacres	First Naval Lord; 1872–1876	Succeeded by Sir Hastings Yelverton
Baronetage of the United Kingdom
New creation	Baronet (of Inveresk); 1876–1896	Succeeded by Archibald Berkeley Milne
