= Lord Lieutenant of Nottinghamshire =

Civil post in Nottinghamshire, England

- Coat of arms of Nottinghamshire
- Incumbent; Professor Veronica Moraa Pickering since March 2024
- Nottinghamshire County Council
- Style: Lord Lieutenants
- Status: Lord Lieutenant
- Member of: Nottinghamshire Council
- Residence: Nottinghamshire
- Seat: Nottinghamshire Council
- Nominator: Political parties
- Appointer: Nottinghamshire County Council
- Term length: no set term
- Formation: 1694
- Website: www.nottinghamshirelieutenancy.co.uk

This is a list of people who have served as Lord Lieutenant of Nottinghamshire. Since 1694, all Lords Lieutenant have also been Custos Rotulorum of Nottinghamshire.

- Henry Manners, 2nd Earl of Rutland 1552–1563?
- Edward Manners, 3rd Earl of Rutland 1574–1587?
- John Manners, 4th Earl of Rutland 3 December 1587 – 24 February 1588
- George Talbot, 6th Earl of Shrewsbury 31 December 1588 – 8 November 1590
- vacant
- William Cavendish, 1st Earl of Newcastle 6 July 1626 – 1642
- Interregnum
- William Cavendish, 1st Duke of Newcastle-upon-Tyne 30 July 1660 – 25 December 1676
- Henry Cavendish, 2nd Duke of Newcastle-upon-Tyne 28 March 1677 – 28 March 1689
- William Pierrepont, 4th Earl of Kingston-upon-Hull 28 March 1689 – 17 September 1690
- vacant
- William Cavendish, 1st Duke of Devonshire 6 May 1692 – 4 June 1694
- John Holles, 1st Duke of Newcastle-upon-Tyne 4 June 1694 – 15 July 1711
- vacant
- Thomas Pelham-Holles, 1st Duke of Newcastle-upon-Tyne 28 October 1714 – 15 January 1763
- Evelyn Pierrepont, 2nd Duke of Kingston-upon-Hull 15 January 1763 – 12 September 1765
- Thomas Pelham-Holles, 1st Duke of Newcastle-upon-Tyne 12 September 1765 – 17 November 1768
- Henry Pelham-Clinton, 2nd Duke of Newcastle-under-Lyne 28 December 1768 – 22 February 1794
- Thomas Pelham-Clinton, 3rd Duke of Newcastle-under-Lyne 2 May 1794 – 17 May 1795
- William Cavendish-Bentinck, 3rd Duke of Portland 19 June 1795 – 30 October 1809
- Henry Pelham-Clinton, 4th Duke of Newcastle-under-Lyne 8 December 1809 – 10 May 1839
- John Lumley-Savile, 8th Earl of Scarbrough 10 May 1839 – 29 October 1856
- Henry Pelham-Clinton, 5th Duke of Newcastle-under-Lyne 4 December 1857 – 18 October 1864
- Edward Strutt, 1st Baron Belper 6 December 1864 – 30 June 1880
- William Beauclerk, 10th Duke of St Albans 25 August 1880 – 10 May 1898
- William Cavendish-Bentinck, 6th Duke of Portland 2 June 1898 – 10 October 1939
- William Cavendish-Bentinck, 7th Duke of Portland 10 October 1939 – 17 May 1962
- Sir Robert Laycock 17 May 1962 – 10 March 1968
- Robert St Vincent Sherbrooke 7 June 1968 – 13 June 1972
- Philip Francklin 6 October 1972 – 9 February 1983
- Sir Gordon Hobday 9 February 1983 – 11 February 1991
- Sir Andrew Buchanan, 5th Baronet 11 February 1991 – July 2012
- Sir John Peace, July 2012 – March 2024
- Professor Veronica Moraa Pickering - March 2024 - Present

== Deputy lieutenants ==
A deputy lieutenant of Nottinghamshire is commissioned by the Lord Lieutenant of Nottinghamshire. Deputy lieutenants support the work of the lord-lieutenant. There can be several deputy lieutenants at any time, depending on the population of the county. Their appointment does not terminate with the changing of the lord-lieutenant, but they usually retire at age 75.

=== 19th Century ===
- 20 December 1803: Charles Pierrepont, 2nd Earl Manvers
- 15 February 1842: Francis Thornhaugh Foljambe
