= John Peace =

British businessman

Sir John Peace CVO CStJ
- Born: John Wilfred Peace; 2 March 1949 (age 77); Mansfield, England
- Education: Royal Military Academy Sandhurst
- Occupation: Businessman
- Title: Chairman of Standard Chartered and Burberry
- Board member of: Standard Chartered; Burberry; The Work Foundation
- Spouse: Christine A Blakemore
- Children: 3

Sir John Wilfred Peace CVO CStJ (born 2 March 1949) is a British businessman, ex-chairman of British fashion house Burberry and ex-chairman of Standard Chartered, a British multinational banking and financial services company. Since 2017, he is Chancellor of Nottingham Trent University.

== Early life ==
Sir John was born in Mansfield, Nottinghamshire (where he still has a home) and attended school there. He was then educated at the Royal Military Academy Sandhurst.

== Career ==
Sir John joined GUS plc after leaving Sandhurst, rising to group chief executive. He held this position from 2000 to 2006. He was Chairman of Experian plc from 2006 to 2014.

Sir John is chairman of Standard Chartered Bank and non-executive chairman of Burberry Group plc since June 2002.

Since February 2016, he has been independent chair of Sub-national Transport Body Midlands Connect, which was set up in 2014 to produce a long-term transport strategy for the Midlands region. In June 2016, he was appointed chair of the Midlands Engine, which was set up by the government to raise productivity and economic growth in the Midlands region, and of which Midlands Connect is the transport arm.

Since 2017, he has been Chancellor of Nottingham Trent University.

=== Other positions and appointments ===
Peace became Lord Lieutenant of Nottinghamshire from 21 July 2012. He was knighted in the 2011 Birthday Honours for services to business and the voluntary sector. He was appointed Commander of the Royal Victorian Order (CVO) in the 2023 Birthday Honours for services as lord lieutenant, and in the same year was appointed Commander of the Order of St John (CStJ).

== Personal life ==
Sir John married Christine "Chris" Blakemore in 1971. They had met at school and started dating when he was 18. She is a school teacher: the couple have three daughters.

Honorary titles
Preceded by Sir Andrew Buchanan, Bt	Lord Lieutenant of Nottinghamshire; 2012-2023	Succeeded by Veronica Pickering
