= Buchanan baronets =

Set index for Buchanan baronets

There have been two baronetcies created for persons with the surname Buchanan, both in the Baronetage of the United Kingdom. As of 2026 one title is extant.

- Buchanan baronets of Dunburgh (1878)
- Buchanan baronets, of Lavington (1920): see Baron Woolavington
