= 1870 Nottingham by-election =

UK Parliamentary by-election

The 1870 Nottingham by-election was fought on 24 February 1870. The by-election was fought due to the resignation of the incumbent MP of the Conservative Party, Charles Ichabod Wright. It was won by the Liberal candidate Auberon Herbert.
