= John Byron, 1st Baron Byron =

English politician and army officer (1599–1652)

The Right Honourable The Lord Byron
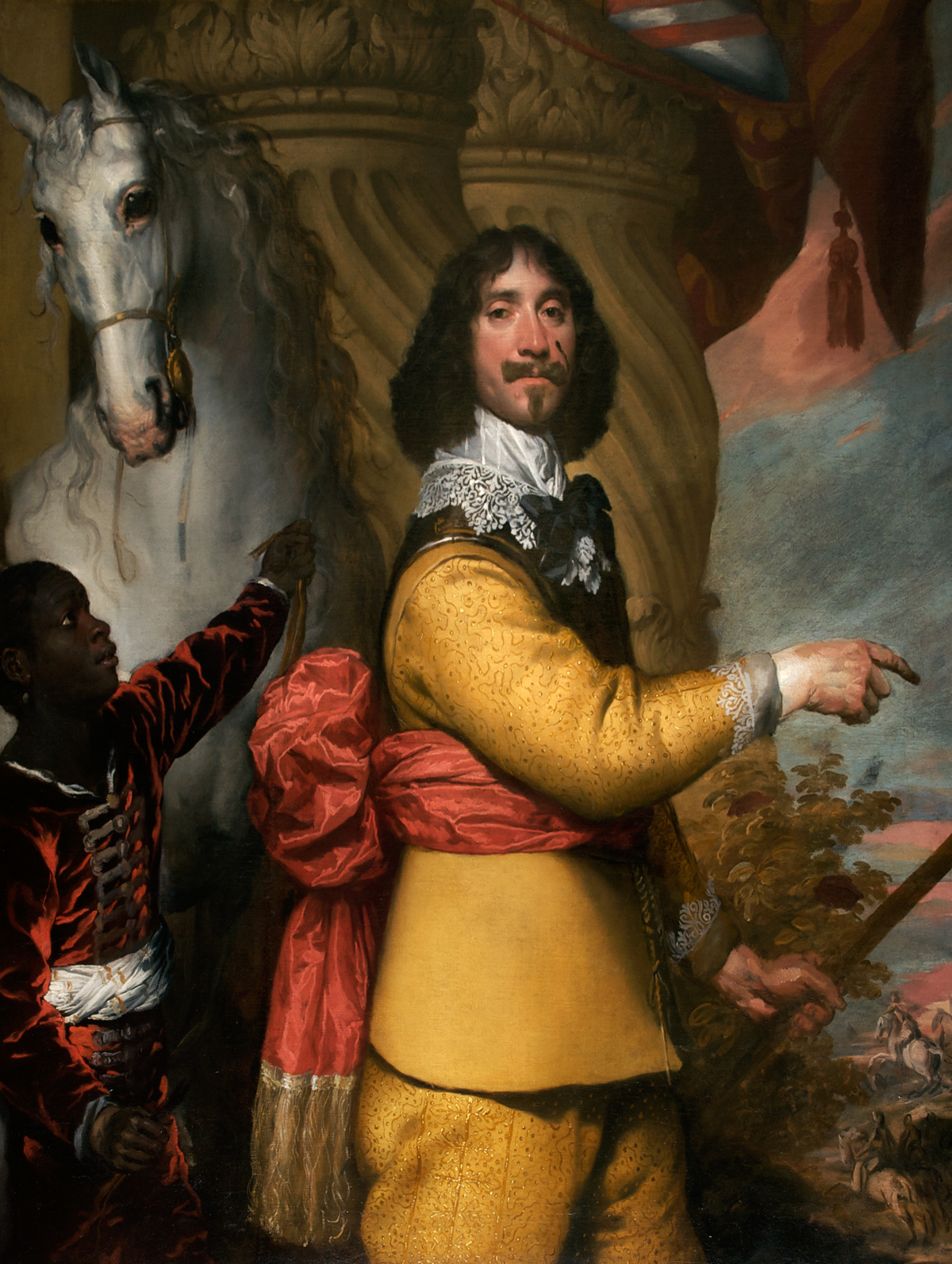
- Portrait of Lord Byron by William Dobson, 1643

Member of the House of Lords Lord Temporal
- In office October 1643 – 23 August 1652; Hereditary peerage
- Preceded by: Peerage established
- Succeeded by: Richard Byron, 2nd Baron Byron

Personal details
- Born: 1599 Newstead, Nottinghamshire
- Died: 23 August 1652 (aged 53) Paris
- Spouse(s): Cecilia West, Eleanor Needham
- Parents: John Byron (father); Anne Molyneux (mother)

John Byron, 1st Baron Byron (1599 – 23 August 1652) was an English politician and army officer who fought on the Royalist side during the English Civil War.

== Life ==
Byron was the son of Sir John Byron of Newstead Abbey, Nottinghamshire, and Anne Molyneux. His grandfather, another Sir John Byron, had represented Nottinghamshire in Parliament. The future first baron was educated at Trinity College, Cambridge. He succeeded his father when the latter died on 28 September 1625.

He was elected as MP for Nottingham in 1624 and 1626. He was knighted in 1626 and was then elected as knight of the shire (MP) for Nottinghamshire in 1628. He also served as High Sheriff of Nottinghamshire for 1634 and then as Lieutenant of the Tower of London, from December 1641 to February 1642.

When the Civil War started, he joined the king at York and soon afterwards was commanding a troop of Nottinghamshire Trained Band Horse at Newark-on-Trent. He was engaged in the Royalists' cause throughout the Civil Wars and afterwards. After Byron distinguished himself at the First Battle of Newbury King Charles created him Baron Byron in October 1643 and made him commander of the Royalist forces in Lancashire and Cheshire. However, he was defeated at the Battle of Nantwich in 1644 and forced to withdraw to Chester. He then marched with Prince Rupert's forces into Yorkshire and commanded the royalist right flank at the Battle of Marston Moor in July 1644, but after his troops were routed by numerically superior parliamentarian forces he retreated to Carnarvon and resigned his command. He did, however, defend Carnarvon Castle ably for the Royalist cause, withstanding long sieges before finally surrendering it to Parliamentary forces in 1646.

Lord Byron died in 1652, childless, in exile in Paris, and was succeeded by his next eldest brother Richard Byron, 2nd Baron Byron (born 1606).

== Family ==
Lord Byron married firstly Cecilia West, daughter of Thomas West, 3rd Baron De La Warr and secondly Eleanor Needham (1627–1664) daughter of Robert Needham, 2nd Viscount Kilmorey. Eleanor was famous for her beauty; Peter Lely painted her as St. Catherine, as depicted here; and according to the diarist Samuel Pepys she was the 17th mistress of Charles II. One of Lord Byron's younger brothers was the Royalist soldier Sir Robert Byron.

== Notes ==
Parliament of England
Preceded by Michael Purefoy; George Lascelles	Member of Parliament for Nottingham; 1624–1625; With: Sir Charles Cavendish	Succeeded by Robert Greaves; John Martyn
Preceded by Robert Greaves; John Martyn	Member of Parliament for Nottingham; 1626; With: Sir Gervase Clifton	Succeeded by Sir Charles Cavendish; Viscount Newark
Preceded by Sir Henry Stanhope; Sir Thomas Hutchinson	Member of Parliament for Nottinghamshire; 1628–1629; With: Sir Gervase Clifton	Parliament suspended until 1640
Peerage of England
New creation	Baron Byron; 1643–1652	Succeeded by Richard Byron
