= Edward Bigland =

English lawyer and politician

Edward Bigland (ca. 1620 – 5 August 1704) was an English lawyer and politician. He was a Member of Parliament (MP) for Nottingham from 1689 to 1690.

== Life ==
He was the son of Edward Bigland, rector of East Leake, Nottinghamshire. He matriculated at Queens' College, Cambridge at Easter 1637, graduating B.A. in 1641, and M.A. in 1644, and becoming a Fellow. He was admitted at Gray's Inn, 26 June 1648.

He became serjeant-at-law in 1680, and was elected recorder of Nottingham. He was summoned before the Privy Council in 1682, after supporting William Sacheverell resisting the surrender of Nottingham's charter. Little more is heard of him until he was elected M.P. for Nottingham in 1689. He settled at Long Whatton, Leicestershire, and was buried there 5 August 1704.

Parliament of England
Preceded by John Beaumont; Sir William Stanhope	Member of Parliament for Nottingham; 1689–1690; With: Francis Pierrepont	Succeeded by Charles Hutchinson; Richard Slater
