= Gilbert Boone =

English lawyer and politician

Gilbert Boone was an English lawyer and politician who sat in the House of Commons in 1640.

Boone was the son of John Boone (or Bohun) of Nottingham. He became a serjeant-at-law at Nottingham and lived at Hockerton. In April 1640, he was elected member of parliament for Nottingham in the Short Parliament. In 1642 Boone was in difficulties with the authorities. The people of Nottingham had submitted a petition to parliament, and Boone had intervened to hinder its submission. He was sent for as a delinquent, by the Serjeant at Arms of the House of Commons, and put out of his commission as justice of the peace. He was placed in custody, and on 3 May 1642 he was bailed.

Parliament of England
Vacant Parliament suspended since 1629	Member of Parliament for Nottingham; 1640; With: Sir Charles Cavendish	Succeeded by William Stanhope; Gilbert Millington
