= David Heath =

David Heath may refer to:

- David Heath (politician) (born 1954), British Liberal Democrat politician
- David Heath (radical) (1827/8–1880), British Chartist and radical politician
- David Heath (fighter) (born 1976), American mixed martial artist
- David Heath (cricket administrator) (1931–1994), cricketer
- David Heath (journalist) (born 1959), American journalist
- David Heath (probabilist) (1943–2011), American probabilist
- David Heath (squash player) (born 1972), Scottish squash player
- Gangrel (David William Heath, born 1969), American professional wrestler
- Dave Heath (1931–2016), American documentary and humanist photographer
