= Francis Pierrepont =

Francis Pierrepont may refer to:

- Francis Pierrepont (died c. 1693) (1662–c. 1693), English politician, Member of Parliament (MP) for Nottingham, 1689–1690
- Francis Pierrepont (Roundhead) (died 1659), English politician, MP for East Retford, 1640, and for Nottingham, 1645–1652
