= John Whalley (MP) =

English politician

John Whalley (born c. 1633, date of death unknown) was an English politician who sat in the House of Commons in 1659.

Whalley was probably the son of Edward Whalley of Essex. He was admitted at Trinity College, Cambridge on 28 April 1649. He was possibly served as captain of horse. In 1659, he was elected Member of Parliament for Nottingham.

Whalley married Elizabeth Springett, daughter of Sir Herbert Springett, in 1658.

Parliament of England
Preceded by James Chadwick; William Drury	Member of Parliament for Nottingham; 1659; With: John Parker	Succeeded by Gilbert Millington
