= Brunel Manor =

Coordinates: 50°30′01″N 3°31′36″W

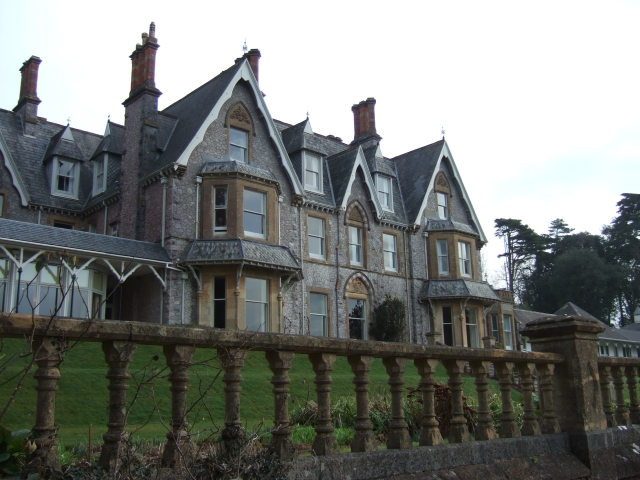
- Brunel Manor
- Interactive map of the Brunel Manor area

General information
- Type: Mansion
- Location: Torquay, United Kingdom
- Owner: ATA Estates

Technical details
- Material: Limestone

Listed Building – Grade II
- Official name: BRUNEL MANOR, TEIGNMOUTH ROAD
- Designated: 8 June 1988
- Reference no.: 1206848

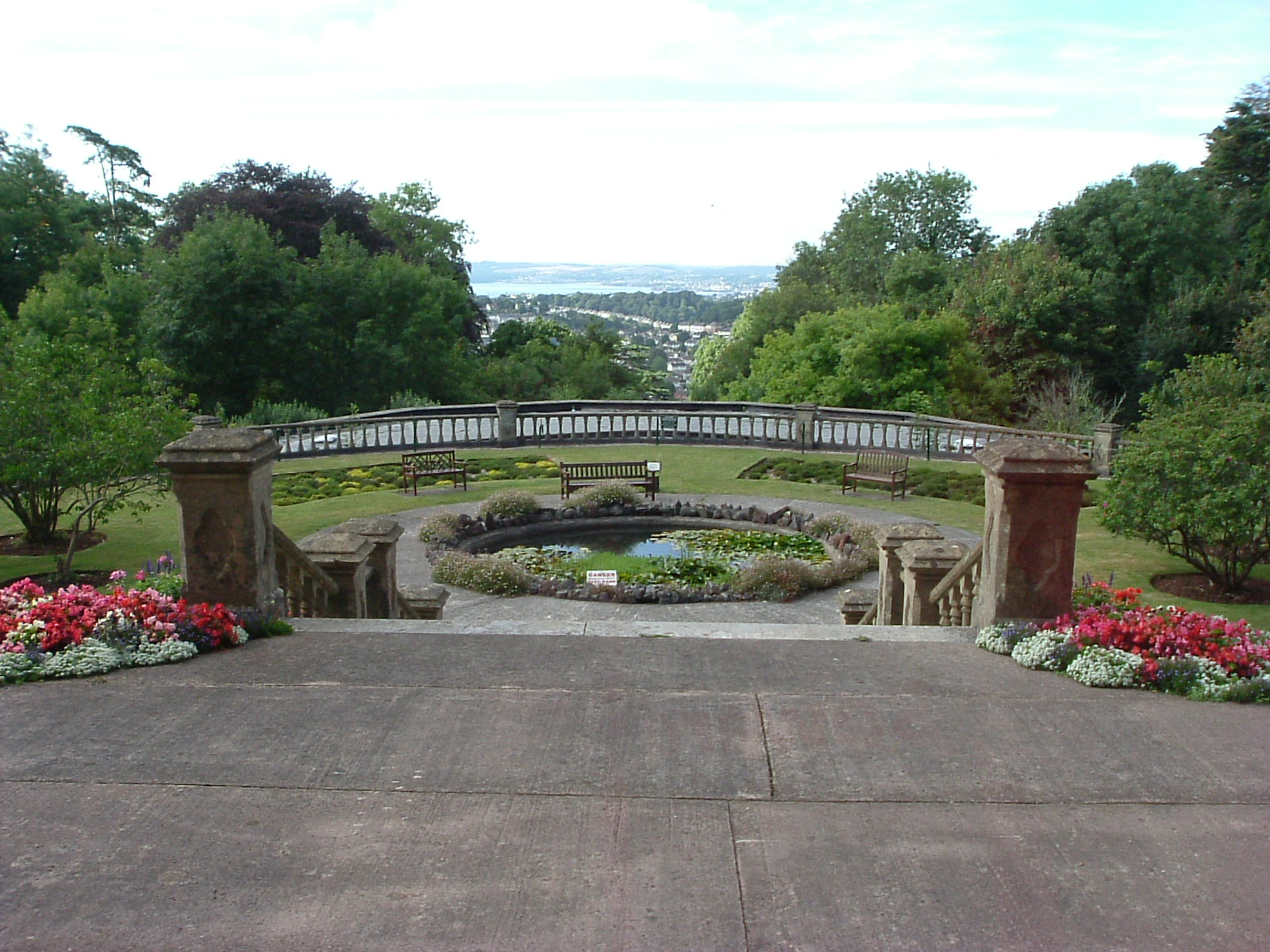
Brunel Manor

Brunel Manor, previously known as Watcombe Park, is a mansion on the outskirts of the seaside resort of Torquay, Devon, England.

== Ownership history ==
The manor and its gardens were designed by William Burn to be the retirement home of Isambard Kingdom Brunel. He discovered the area while surveying for the Great Western Railway, and he and his family later spent many holidays in the town. He eventually purchased the plot of land with a view to designing and building his dream home to which he would retire.

Brunel never saw the house or gardens finished due to his death in 1859. He had already imported large quantities of Oregon Pine timber and the foundations were laid, so a buyer had to be found who was prepared to work with what was already done. It was briefly owned by John and Robert Vicary but the site stood idle until acquired by paper manufacturer James Crompton in 1873. He re-designed the exterior appearance from Brunel's Italianate style to the French style and built the present house on Brunel's foundations. He also purchased a large amount of the surrounding land, the estate amounting to some 200 hectares (500 acres) at that time and named as Watcombe Park.

During the following 90 years the house was variously occupied by Charles Ichabod Wright, Mr James Peck, Sir John Edwards-Moss, Frederick James Lund, Thomas John Crossman, Stockwell College of Education (evacuated from London during World War II), and the Holiday Fellowship (who gave the estate its current name). Various portions of the estate were sold off with each transaction and by 1940 just 4 hectares (10 acres) of land were left.

The house and gardens were purchased in January 1963 for £28,500 by The Woodlands House of Prayer Trust who relocated from premises in Eastbourne.

=== 1963 to 2021 ===
Brunel Manor was until 2021 operated by The Woodlands House of Prayer Trust as a Christian holiday, retreat and conference centre. The house was considerably extended for this purpose during those years, and the gatehouse lodge was re-purchased from private owners in 1986.

=== 2021 to present ===
During the COVID-19 pandemic the conference centre became unviable and in 2021 Brunel Manor was sold to ATA Estates (Brunel Manor) LLP, a residential property development company. In 2023 they published plans to remove various 20th century additions and subdivide the Manor into residential apartments.

== About the building ==
The Manor was recorded as a Grade II Listed Building in 1988 due to its historical and architectural significance. It is mainly constructed of local grey limestone with window surrounds and other decorative features in Bath Stone. The original house was mostly built as three storeys (a fourth over the entrance tower). A hall in matching style was later added to the east; available dates for this addition are vague, quoted by Brunel Manor's own information document as being between 1907 and 1923.

The Fire Precautions Act 1971 came into force in 1972, when hotels and boarding houses were the first class of premises to be designated. Under the Fire Precautions (Hotels and Boarding Houses) Order 1972, (Statutory Instrument (SI) 1972 /238) any premises where there was sleeping accommodation for more than 6 persons (staff or guests) or sleeping accommodation above the first floor required a fire certificate issued by the local fire authority. This required partitioning to be built across previously open galleried landings, fireproofing of many doors and door frames, removal of combustible material, and installation of a fire alarm system. This means that many original features are now hidden behind plasterboard, corridors divided by modern fire doors or internal views seen through wired glass. The scale of this internal alteration can be appreciated by its cost in 1973 of £9000, the same as the average price of a house bought in the UK that year.

Between 1980 and 1998 two loft conversions and four extensions were added which are in a more modern style, built to serve the present day needs of the holiday centre.
