= Nottingham (UK Parliament constituency) =

Parliamentary constituency in the United Kingdom, 1801–1885

- Former borough constituency for the House of Commons
- Riotous hustings in the Great Marketplace on 26 June 1865

1295–1885
- Seats: two
- Replaced by: Nottingham East, Nottingham South and Nottingham West

Nottingham was a parliamentary borough in Nottinghamshire, which elected two Members of Parliament (MPs) to the House of Commons from 1295. In 1885 the constituency was abolished and the city of Nottingham divided into three single-member constituencies.

== History ==
Nottingham sent two representatives to Parliament from 1283 onwards.

In the mid eighteenth century it was influenced by the large local landowners the Duke of Newcastle for the Whigs and Lord Middleton for the Tories and as a consequence would tend to return MP from each party.

The constituency was abolished in 1885 and replaced by Nottingham East, Nottingham South and Nottingham West.

== Members of Parliament ==
=== 1295–1640 ===
Parliament	First member	Second member
1318	Robert Ingram	Simon Folville
1322 (May)	Geoffrey le Flemyng	Simon Folville
1327 (Jan)	Robert Ingram of Nottingham	Simon Folville
1384 (Apr)	John Tansley	
1385	John Crowshaw	
1386	William Butler	Robert Howden
1388 (Feb)	John Crowshaw	John Plumtre
1388 (Sep)	William Butler	Thomas Mapperley
1390 (Jan)	William Butler	Robert German
1390 (Nov)		
1391	William Butler	Thomas Mapperley
1393	William Butler	Nicholas Alestre
1394		
1395	Thomas Mapperley	Robert German (MP)
1397 (Jan)	Thomas Mapperley	Robert German (MP)
1397 (Sep)	William Gresley	John Hodings
1399	John Plumtre	John Tansley
1401		
1402		
1404 (Jan)		
1404 (Oct)		
1406	Walter Stacy	Thomas Fox
1407	John Bothall	John Jorce
1410		
1411	Thomas Mapperley	John Hodings
1413 (Feb)	Thomas Mapperley	John Hodings 1
1413 (May)	Thomas Mapperley	John Tansley
1414 (Apr)	John Tansley	Robert Glade
1414 (Nov)	Walter Stacy	Henry Preston
1415		
1416 (Mar)	John Alestre	John Bingham
1416 (Oct)		
1417	Henry Preston	William Burton
1419	Robert Glade	Richard Samon
1420	John Bingham	Thomas Poge
1421 (May)	Robert Glade	John Alestre
1421 (Dec)	Richard Samon	Thomas Poge
1422	John Alestre	Thomas Poge
1423	Thomas Poge	
1425	John Alestre	
1427	Thomas Poge	
1510–1523	No names known	
1529	Anthony Babington	Henry Statham, died and replaced Jan 1535 by Nicholas Quarnby
1536	?Sir Anthony Babington	?
1539	Sir John Markham	George Pierrepont
1542	Edward Chamberlain	?Sir John Markham
1545	Sir John Markham	Nicholas Powtrell
1547	John Paston	Nicholas Powtrell
1553 (Mar)	Robert Haselrigg	Francis Colman
1553 (Oct)	Humphrey Quarnby	Thomas Markham
1554 (Apr)	Humphrey Quarnby	Francis Colman
1554 (Nov)	Nicholas Powtrell	William Markham
1555	Hugh Thornhill	John Bateman
1558	Francis Colman	Edward Boun
1558 (Dec)	Thomas Markham	John Bateman
1562–1563	Humphrey Quarnby, died and replaced 1566 by Ralph Barton	John Bateman
1571	Ralph Barton	William Ball
1572 (Apr)	Sir Thomas Manners	John Bateman
1584 (Oct)	Richard Parkins	John Bateman
1586	Sir Robert Constable	Richard Parkins
1588–1589	Richard Parkins	George Manners
1593	Richard Parkins	Humphrey Bonner
1597 (Sep)	Humphrey Bonner	Anchor Jackson
1601	William Gregory	William Greaves
1604–1611	Richard Harte (or Hunt)	Anchor Jackson
1614	William Gregory	Robert Staples
1621	Michael Purefoy	George Lascelles
1623	John Byron	Sir Charles Cavendish
1625	Robert Greaves	John Martyn
1626	Sir Gervase Clifton	John Byron
1628	Sir Charles Cavendish	Viscount Newark
1629–1640	No Parliaments convened	

=== 1640–1885 ===
Year	First member	First party	Second member	Second party
April 1640	Charles Cavendish	Royalist	Gilbert Boone	
November 1640	William Stanhope	Royalist	Gilbert Millington	Parliamentarian
January 1644	Stanhope disabled to sit – seat vacant		Gilbert Millington	Parliamentarian
1645	Francis Pierrepont		Gilbert Millington	Parliamentarian
1653	Nottingham was unrepresented in the Barebones Parliament			
1654	James Chadwick		John Mason	
1656	James Chadwick		William Drury	
January 1659	John Whalley		John Parker	
May 1659	Gilbert Millington		One seat vacant	
April 1660	Arthur Stanhope		John Hutchinson (banned as Regicide)	
June 1660	Arthur Stanhope		Robert Pierrepont	
1679	Richard Slater		Robert Pierrepont	
1685	John Beaumont		Sir William Stanhope	
1689	Francis Pierrepont		Edward Bigland	
1690	Charles Hutchinson		Richard Slater	
1695	William Pierrepont		Richard Slater	
1699	William Pierrepont		Robert Sacheverell	
January 1701	William Pierrepont		George Gregory	
June 1701	William Pierrepont		Robert Sacheverell	
December 1701	William Pierrepont		Robert Sacheverell	
1702	William Pierrepont		George Gregory	
1705	William Pierrepont		Robert Sacheverell	
1706	John Plumptre	Whig	Robert Sacheverell	
1708	John Plumptre	Whig	Roby Sherwin	
1710	John Plumptre	Whig	Robert Sacheverell	
1713	Borlase Warren	Tory	Robert Sacheverell	
1715	John Plumptre	Whig	George Gregory	Whig
1727	John Stanhope		Borlase Warren	Tory
1734	John Plumptre	Whig	Borlase Warren	Tory
May 1747	John Plumptre	Whig	Sir Charles Sedley	
June 1747	George Howe	Whig	Sir Charles Sedley	
1754	George Howe	Whig	Sir Willoughby Aston	Tory
1758	Colonel the Hon. (Sir) William Howe (Note: Later General; knighted 1775)	Whig	Sir Willoughby Aston	Tory
1761	Colonel the Hon. (Sir) William Howe	Whig	John Plumptre	
1774	Colonel the Hon. (Sir) William Howe	Whig	Sir Charles Sedley	Tory
1778	Colonel the Hon. (Sir) William Howe	Whig	Abel Smith	
1779	Colonel the Hon. (Sir) William Howe	Whig	Robert Smith	Whig
1780	Daniel Coke	Tory	Robert Smith	Whig
1797	Daniel Coke	Tory	Captain Sir John Borlase Warren (Note: Later Rear-Admiral)	Tory
1802	Joseph Birch (Note: On petition, Birch was found not to have been duly elected)	Whig	Captain Sir John Borlase Warren	Tory
1803	Daniel Coke	Tory	Captain Sir John Borlase Warren	Tory
1806	Daniel Coke	Tory	John Smith	Whig
1812	George Parkyns	Whig	John Smith	Whig
1818	George Parkyns	Whig	Joseph Birch	Whig
1820	Thomas Denman	Whig	Joseph Birch	Whig
1826	George Parkyns	WHIG	Joseph Birch	Whig
1830	Thomas Denman	Whig	Sir Ronald Craufurd Ferguson	Whig
1832	John Ponsonby	Whig	Sir Ronald Craufurd Ferguson	Whig
1834	Sir John Hobhouse	Radical	Sir Ronald Craufurd Ferguson	Whig
April 1841	Sir John Hobhouse	Radical	John Walter	Conservative
June 1841	Sir John Hobhouse	Radical	George Larpent	Whig
1842	Sir John Hobhouse	Radical	John Walter (Note: On petition, Walter's election was declared void and a by-election held, in which his son, John Walter (junior), took his place as Conservative candidate and was defeated)	Conservative
1843	Sir John Hobhouse	Radical	Thomas Gisborne	Whig
1847	John Walter (junior)	Conservative	Feargus O'Connor	Chartist
1852	John Walter (junior)	Peelite	Edward Strutt	Whig
1856	John Walter (junior)	Peelite	Charles Paget	Radical
1859	John Mellor	Liberal	Charles Paget	Liberal
1861	Sir Robert Juckes Clifton	Ind. Liberal	Charles Paget	Liberal
1865 (Note: On petition, the election of 1865 was declared void and a by-election held)	Sir Robert Juckes Clifton	Ind. Liberal	Samuel Morley	Liberal
1866	Ralph Bernal Osborne	Ind. Liberal	Viscount Amberley	Liberal
1868	Sir Robert Juckes Clifton	Ind. Liberal	Charles Ichabod Wright	Conservative
1869	Charles Seely	Liberal	Charles Ichabod Wright	Conservative
1870	Charles Seely	Liberal	Hon. Auberon Herbert	Liberal
1874	William Evelyn Denison	Conservative	Saul Isaac	Conservative
April 1880	Charles Seely	Liberal	John Skirrow Wright	Liberal
May 1880	Charles Seely	Liberal	Arnold Morley	Liberal
1885	Constituency abolished			

== Election results ==
=== Elections in the 1830s ===
General election 1830: Nottingham
Party	Candidate	Votes	%	±%
Whig	Thomas Denman	1,206	46.2	
Whig	Ronald Craufurd Ferguson	1,180	45.2	
Tory	Thomas Bailey	226	8.7	
Majority		954	36.5	
Turnout		1,413	c. 28.3	
Registered electors		c. 5,000		
Whig hold		Swing		
Whig hold		Swing		

General election 1831: Nottingham
Party	Candidate	Votes	%
Whig	Thomas Denman	Unopposed	
Whig	Ronald Craufurd Ferguson	Unopposed	
Registered electors		c. 5,000	
Whig hold			
Whig hold			

General election 1832: Nottingham
Party	Candidate	Votes	%
Whig	Ronald Craufurd Ferguson	2,399	41.9
Whig	John Ponsonby	2,349	41.0
Tory	James Edward Gordon	976	17.1
Majority		1,373	23.9
Turnout		3,322	63.6
Registered electors		5,220	
Whig hold			
Whig hold			

Ponsonby was appointed Home Secretary and elevated to the House of Lords as Lord Duncannon, causing a by-election.

By-election, 25 July 1834: Nottingham
Party	Candidate	Votes	%	±%
Radical	John Hobhouse	1,591	73.8	N/A
Radical	William Eagle	566	26.2	N/A
Majority		1,025	47.6	N/A
Turnout		2,157	41.8	−21.8
Registered electors		5,166		
Radical gain from Whig				

General election 1835: Nottingham
Party	Candidate	Votes	%
Whig	Ronald Craufurd Ferguson	Unopposed	
Radical	John Hobhouse	Unopposed	
Registered electors		4,454	
Whig hold			
Radical gain from Whig			

Hobhouse was appointed as President of the Board of Control for the Affairs of India, requiring a by-election.

By-election, 24 April 1835: Nottingham
Party	Candidate	Votes	%
Radical	John Hobhouse	Unopposed	
Radical hold			

General election 1837: Nottingham
Party	Candidate	Votes	%
Whig	Ronald Craufurd Ferguson	2,056	29.8
Radical	John Hobhouse	2,052	29.7
Conservative	William Plowden	1,397	20.2
Conservative	Horace Twiss	1,396	20.2
Turnout		3,728	68.1
Registered electors		5,475	
Majority		4	0.1
Whig hold			
Majority		655	9.5
Radical hold			

=== Elections in the 1840s ===
Ferguson's death caused a by-election.

By-election, 26 April 1841: Nottingham
Party	Candidate	Votes	%	±%
Conservative	John Walter Sr.	1,983	53.2	+12.8
Whig	George Larpent	1,745	46.8	+17.0
Majority		238	6.4	N/A
Turnout		3,728	79.7	+11.6
Registered electors		4,678		
Conservative gain from Whig		Swing	−2.1	

General election 1841: Nottingham
Party	Candidate	Votes	%	±%
Whig	George Larpent	529	39.4	+9.6
Radical	John Hobhouse	527	39.3	+9.6
Conservative	John Walter Sr.	144	10.7	−9.5
Conservative	Thomas Broughton Charlton	142	10.6	−9.6
Turnout		671 (est)	14.3 (est)	c. −53.8
Registered electors		5,260		
Majority		2	0.1	±0.0
Whig hold		Swing	+9.6	
Majority		383	28.6	+19.1
Radical hold		Swing	+9.6	

Walter and Charlton retired half an hour after the poll opened.

Larpent resigned by accepting the office of Steward of the Chiltern Hundreds, causing a by-election.

By-election, 4 August 1842: Nottingham
Party	Candidate	Votes	%	±%
Conservative	John Walter Sr.	1,885	51.1	+29.8
Radical	Joseph Sturge	1,801	48.9	+9.6
Majority		84	2.2	N/A
Turnout		3,686	67.8	+53.5
Registered electors		5,436		
Conservative gain from Whig		Swing	+10.1	

Walter's election was declared void, on petition, due to bribery by his agents, on 23 March 1843, causing a by-election.

By-election, 5 April 1843: Nottingham
Party	Candidate	Votes	%	±%
Whig	Thomas Gisborne	1,839	51.6	+12.2
Conservative	John Walter Jr.	1,728	48.4	+27.1
Majority		111	3.0	+2.9
Turnout		3,567	69.0	+54.7
Registered electors		5,172		
Whig hold		Swing	−7.5	

Hobhouse was appointed President of the Board of Control for the Affairs of India, requiring a by-election.

By-election, 8 July 1846: Nottingham
Party	Candidate	Votes	%	±%
Radical	John Hobhouse	Unopposed		
Radical hold				

General election 1847: Nottingham
Party	Candidate	Votes	%	±%
Conservative	John Walter Jr.	1,683	34.8	+13.5
Chartist	Feargus O'Connor	1,257	26.0	N/A
Whig	Thomas Gisborne	999	20.7	−18.7
Radical	John Hobhouse	893	18.5	−20.8
Turnout		2,416 (est)	46.9 (est)	+32.6
Registered electors		5,148		
Majority		684	13.9	N/A
Conservative gain from Whig		Swing	+16.1	
Majority		364	7.5	N/A
Chartist gain from Radical		Swing		

=== Elections in the 1850s ===
General election 1852: Nottingham
Party	Candidate	Votes	%	±%
Whig	Edward Strutt	1,960	45.2	+24.5
Peelite	John Walter Jr.	1,863	43.0	+8.2
Chartist	Charles Sturgeon	512	11.8	−14.2
Turnout		2,168 (est)	41.2 (est)	−5.7
Registered electors		5,260		
Majority		1,448	33.4	N/A
Whig gain from Chartist		Swing	+15.8	
Majority		1,351	31.2	N/A
Peelite gain from Conservative		Swing	+7.7	

Strutt was appointed Chancellor of the Duchy of Lancaster, requiring a by-election.

By-election, 1 January 1853: Nottingham
Party	Candidate	Votes	%	±%
Whig	Edward Strutt	Unopposed		
Whig hold				

Strutt was elevated to the peerage, becoming 1st Baron Belper, requiring a by-election.

By-election, 30 July 1856: Nottingham
Party	Candidate	Votes	%	±%
Radical	Charles Paget	Unopposed		
Radical gain from Whig				

General election 1857: Nottingham
Party	Candidate	Votes	%	±%
Radical	Charles Paget	2,393	49.4	+4.2
Peelite	John Walter Jr.	1,836	37.9	−5.1
Chartist	Ernest Charles Jones	614	12.7	+0.9
Turnout		2,422 (est)	42.9 (est)	+1.7
Registered electors		5,650		
Majority		557	11.5	N/A
Radical gain from Whig		Swing	+1.9	
Majority		1,222	25.2	−6.0
Peelite hold		Swing	−2.8	

General election 1859: Nottingham
Party	Candidate	Votes	%	±%
Liberal	Charles Paget	2,456	37.1	+12.4
Liberal	John Mellor	2,181	32.9	+8.2
Conservative	Thomas Bromley	1,836	27.7	−10.2
Chartist	Ernest Charles Jones	151	2.3	−10.4
Majority		345	5.2	−6.3
Turnout		3,312 (est)	55.1 (est)	+12.2
Registered electors		6,012		
Liberal hold		Swing	+8.8	
Liberal hold		Swing	+6.7	

=== Elections in the 1860s ===
Mellor resigned after being appointed a Judge of the Queen's Bench Division of the High Court of Justice, causing a by-election.

By-election, 26 December 1861: Nottingham
Party	Candidate	Votes	%	±%
Independent Liberal	Robert Juckes Clifton	2,513	69.1	New
Liberal	Henry Pelham-Clinton	1,122	30.9	−29.1
Majority		1,391	38.2	N/A
Turnout		3,635	55.6	+0.5
Registered electors		6,533		
Independent Liberal gain from Liberal		Swing		

General election 1865: Nottingham
Party	Candidate	Votes	%	±%
Liberal	Samuel Morley	2,393	25.7	−7.2
Independent Liberal	Robert Juckes Clifton	2,352	25.3	N/A
Liberal	Charles Paget	2,327	25.0	−12.1
Conservative	Alfred Marten	2,242	24.1	−3.6
Turnout		4,657 (est)	78.5 (est)	+23.4
Registered electors		5,934		
Majority		41	0.4	−4.8
Liberal hold		Swing	−2.7	
Majority		25	0.3	N/A
Independent Liberal gain from Liberal		Swing		

The election, "won by violence" and bribery was declared void on petition, causing a by-election.

By-election, 11 May 1866: Nottingham
Party	Candidate	Votes	%	±%
Independent Liberal	Ralph Bernal Osborne	2,518	25.9	N/A
Liberal	John Russell	2,494	25.6	−0.1
Conservative	George Jenkinson	2,411	24.8	+0.7
Liberal	Handel Cossham	2,307	23.7	−1.3
Independent Liberal	David Faulkner	3	0.0	N/A
Turnout		4,867 (est)	82.0 (est)	+3.5
Registered electors		5,934		
Majority		24	0.3	0.0
Independent Liberal hold		Swing	N/A	
Majority		83	0.8	+0.5
Liberal hold		Swing	−0.2	

General election 1868: Nottingham
Party	Candidate	Votes	%	±%
Independent Liberal	Robert Juckes Clifton	5,285	28.4	+3.1
Conservative	Charles Ichabod Wright	4,591	24.6	+0.5
Liberal	Charles Seely	4,004	21.5	−4.2
Liberal	Peter Clayden	2,716	14.6	−10.7
Independent Liberal	Ralph Bernal Osborne	2,031	10.9	N/A
Turnout		11,609 (est)	81.9 (est)	+3.4
Registered electors		14,168		
Majority		694	3.8	+3.5
Independent Liberal hold		Swing	+5.3	
Majority		587	3.1	N/A
Conservative gain from Liberal		Swing	+4.0	

- Wright was a Liberal-Conservative candidate.

Clifton's death caused a by-election.

By-election, 16 June 1869: Nottingham
Party	Candidate	Votes	%	±%
Liberal	Charles Seely	4,627	50.6	+14.5
Independent Liberal	William Digby Seymour	4,517	49.4	+10.1
Majority		110	1.2	N/A
Turnout		9,144	64.5	−17.4
Registered electors		14,168		
Liberal gain from Independent Liberal		Swing		

=== Elections in the 1870s ===
Wright's resignation caused a by-election.

By-election, 24 Feb 1870: Nottingham
Party	Candidate	Votes	%	±%
Liberal	Auberon Herbert	4,971	51.5	+15.4
Independent Liberal	William Digby Seymour	4,675	48.5	+9.2
Majority		296	3.0	N/A
Turnout		9,646	68.1	−13.8
Registered electors		14,168		
Liberal gain from Conservative		Swing		

General election 1874: Nottingham
Party	Candidate	Votes	%	±%
Conservative	William Evelyn Denison	5,268	24.9	+12.6
Conservative	Saul Isaac	4,790	22.6	+10.3
Liberal	Robert Laycock	3,732	17.6	−3.9
Liberal	Henry Labouchère	3,545	16.8	+2.2
Lib-Lab	David Heath	2,752	13.0	New
Independent Liberal	Richard Birkin	1,074	5.1	−34.2
Majority		1,058	5.0	+1.9
Turnout		10,581 (est)	65.5 (est)	−16.4
Registered electors		16,154		
Conservative hold		Swing	+6.7	
Conservative gain from Independent Liberal		Swing	+5.6	

=== Elections in the 1880s ===
General election 1880: Nottingham
Party	Candidate	Votes	%	±%
Liberal	Charles Seely	8,499	31.3	+13.7
Liberal	John Skirrow Wright	8,055	29.6	+12.8
Conservative	Saul Isaac	5,575	20.5	−2.1
Conservative	William Gill	5,052	18.6	−6.3
Majority		2,480	9.1	N/A
Turnout		13,591 (est)	72.7 (est)	+7.2
Registered electors		18,699		
Liberal gain from Conservative		Swing	+7.9	
Liberal gain from Conservative		Swing	+9.6	

Wright's death caused a by-election.

By-election, 8 May 1880: Nottingham
Party	Candidate	Votes	%	±%
Liberal	Arnold Morley	Unopposed		
Liberal hold				

== Sources ==
- Robert Beatson, "A Chronological Register of Both Houses of Parliament" (London: Longman, Hurst, Res & Orme, 1807)
- F W S Craig, "British Parliamentary Election Results 1832–1885" (2nd edition, Aldershot: Parliamentary Research Services, 1989)
- J Holladay Philbin, Parliamentary Representation 1832 – England and Wales (New Haven: Yale University Press, 1965)
- Leigh Rayment's Historical List of MPs – Constituencies beginning with "N" (part 3)
