= Sir Charles Seely, 1st Baronet =

British industrialist and politician (1833–1915)

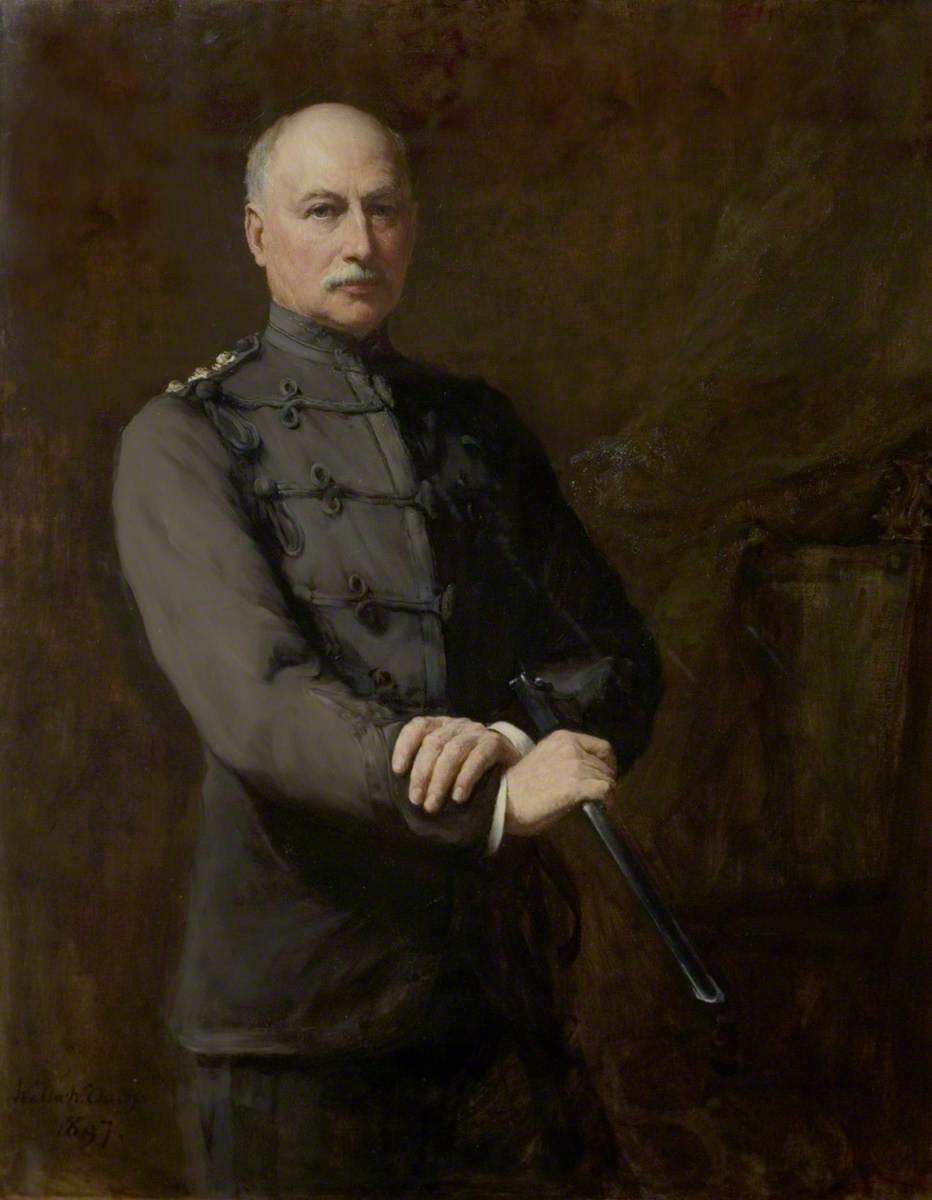
Seely in 1897, by Walter William Ouless

Colonel Sir Charles Seely, 1st Baronet KGStJ, DL (11 August 1833 – 16 April 1915) was a British industrialist and politician.

Seely was Liberal Party Member of Parliament (MP) for Nottingham from 1869 to 1874 and 1880 to 1885, and for Nottingham West from 1885 to 1886, and Liberal Unionist MP for Nottingham West from 1892 to 1895. He was an industrialist and major landowner on the Isle of Wight and in Nottinghamshire. He was also a noted philanthropist. In October 1895 he was the 1st person to be presented with the honorary Freedom of the City of Nottingham, for "Eminent services and noble generosity towards the philanthropic institutions of the City." He was made a baronet on 19 February 1896.

He lived at Langford Hall and then Sherwood Lodge in Nottinghamshire, Brooke House on the Isle of Wight, and No.1 Carlton House Terrace in London. He also built Brook Hill House where J. B. Priestley, the famous author and playwright, later lived from 1948. He was a Deputy Lieutenant of Nottinghamshire, and High Sheriff of Nottinghamshire. He was the Colonel of the 1st Nottinghamshire (Robin Hood) Rifle Volunteers. He was Vice-Chairman of the first Nottinghamshire County Council. He was also a Knight of Grace Order of St John of Jerusalem.

Seely was a member of a family of politicians, industrialists and significant landowners. His father, Charles Seely (1803–1887), was a member of parliament and one of the wealthiest industrialists of the Victorian era. Sir Charles and his eldest son Sir Charles Seely, 2nd Baronet, youngest son J. E. B. Seely, 1st Baron Mottistone, and grandson Sir Hugh Seely, 3rd Baronet and 1st Baron Sherwood, were also all members of parliament. His grandson, David Seely, 4th Baron Mottistone, was the last Governor of the Isle of Wight; he was baptised with Winston Churchill and the then Duke of Cornwall (subsequently King Edward VIII, and then later Duke of Windsor) as his godparents. The 4th Baron Mottistone's son Peter John Philip Seely, 5th Baron Mottistone (1949–2013), was a godson of Queen Elizabeth II's husband Prince Philip, Duke of Edinburgh. His great-great-grandson, Bob Seely, was the MP for the Isle of Wight from 2017 to 2024.

== Wife and some descendants ==
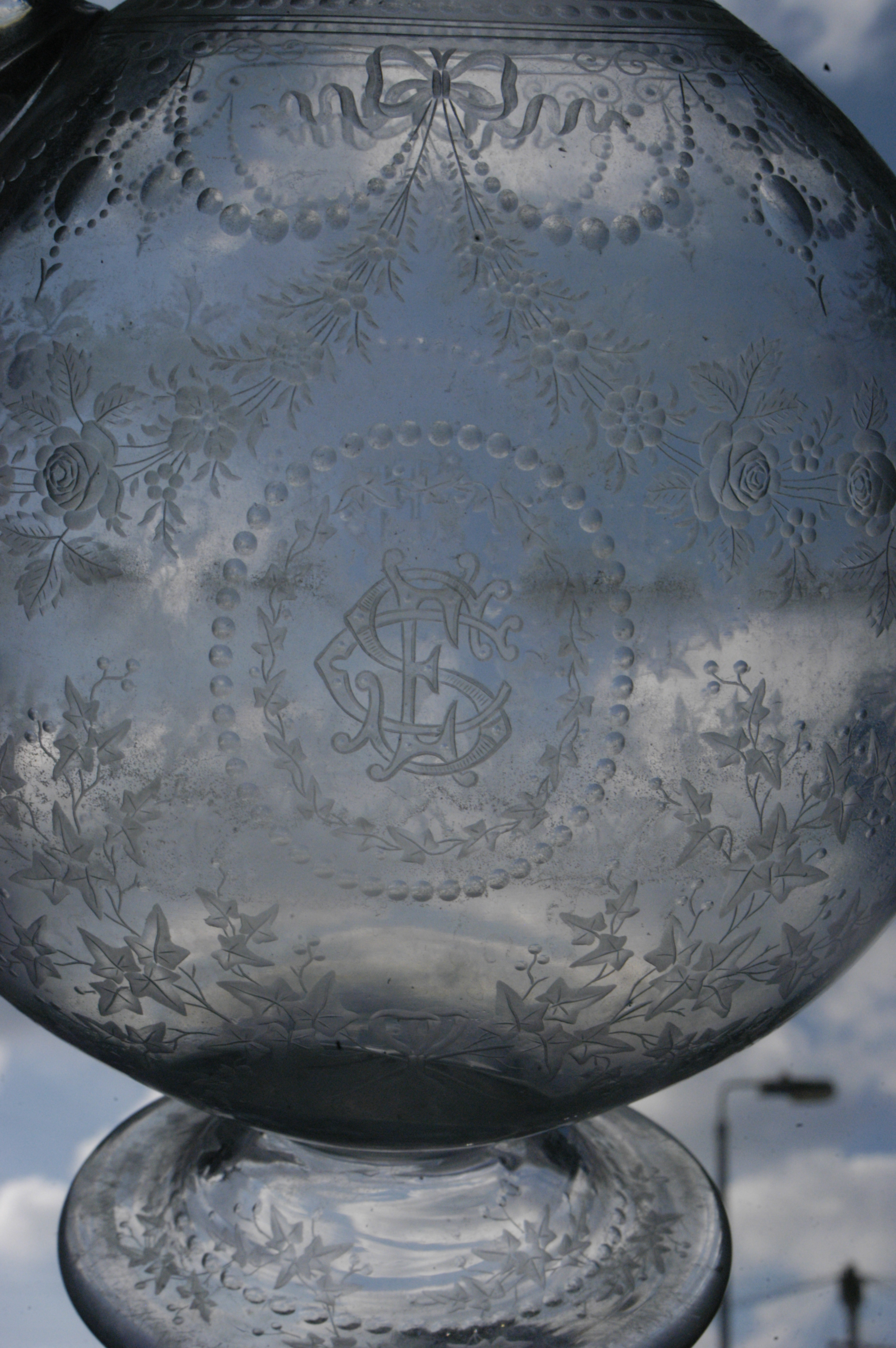
Glass jug with monogram for Charles Seely and his wife Emily Evans.

Seely married Emily Evans (died 1894), sister of the businessman and politician Sir Francis Evans, 1st Baronet, on 11 August 1857. He is a great-grandfather, via her mother Leila Emily Seely, of Rachel Douglas-Home, 27th Baroness Dacre, a descendant of Charles II of England who married William Douglas-Home, younger brother of the Prime Minister and 14th Earl Sir Alec Douglas-Home. He is the great-great grandfather of George William Beaumont Howard, the current and 13th Earl of Carlisle, whose principal family seat was Castle Howard. His son Lt-Col Frank Evelyn Seely married Leila Eliza Russell, great-granddaughter of John Russell, 6th Duke of Bedford and granddaughter of Lord Charles James Fox Russell whose half brother was Prime Minister John Russell, 1st Earl Russell. Their son Major Frank James Wriothesley Seely (1901–1956), married (1925) Vera Lilian Margaret Birkin (1903–1970), a granddaughter of Sir Thomas Isaac Birkin, 1st Bt. (1831–1922), whose great granddaughter is Jane Birkin (born 1946), actress, partner of Serge Gainsbourg in the 1970s and namesake of the Hermès Birkin bag. The Michael Seely Memorial Stakes held at York was named in honour of their eldest son, the racing correspondent. He is also the great-great-grandfather of Bob Seely, Member of Parliament for the Isle of Wight 2017–2024.

Seely is a third great-grandfather, via his youngest son, J. E. B. Seely, 1st Baron Mottistone, of theatre director Sophie Hunter, who married actor Benedict Cumberbatch on 14 February 2015, at the 12th century St Peter and St Paul's Church, Mottistone, on the Isle of Wight followed by a reception at Mottistone Manor.

== Wealth at death ==
When Seely died in 1915 he left estate of £1,052,070 (equivalent to £641 million (in 2014), or £75 million (in 2015), obtained by multiplying £1,052,070.00 by the percentage increase in the RPI since 1915), as measured by share of UK GDP, UK CPI), which was according to The Times, the second largest estate that year (by comparison the estate of Nathan Mayer Rothschild, 1st Baron Rothschild was the largest valued at £2,500,000) and made him one of the wealthiest men in Britain.

== External links and sources ==
- Burke's Peerage and Baronetage 107th Edition Volume III *Seely Baronets
- Seely family crest
- The Great Houses of Nottinghamshire, Sherwood Lodge (1881)
- Seely estates listed at UK National Registry of Archives
- University of London and History of Parliament Trust &
- Link to St Paul's Church built by Sir Charles Seely Bt in 1896 and monument to his wife Emily Seely designed by Sir Thomas Brock.
- Art collection included Cicero's Villa by J. M. W. Turner, see: and paintings of Venice by Myles Birket Foster commissioned by his father-
- Wight Life April/May 1975 article on The Seely Family and their Island Homes
- J. E. B. Seely, 1st Baron Mottistone, Dictionary of National Biography, 1941–1950
- The Times obituary 1915, Wills and Bequests.
- Economic power measured by wealth as compared to the size of the economy (List of most wealthy historical figures), which is measured by share of GDP. Data from Measuring Worth:
- Occupants of No.1 Carlton House Terrace

== Notes ==
Parliament of the United Kingdom
Preceded by Charles Ichabod Wright; Sir Robert Juckes Clifton	Member of Parliament for Nottingham; 1869–1874; With: Charles Ichabod Wright until 1870; Auberon Herbert from 1870	Succeeded by William Evelyn Denison; Saul Isaac
Preceded by William Evelyn Denison; Saul Isaac	Member of Parliament for Nottingham; 1880–1885; With: John Skirrow Wright 1880; Arnold Morley 1880–1885	Constituency abolished
New constituency	Member of Parliament for Nottingham West; 1885–1886	Succeeded by Henry Broadhurst
Preceded by Henry Broadhurst	Member of Parliament for Nottingham West; 1892–1895	Succeeded by James Yoxall
Honorary titles
Preceded by Francis Foljambe	High Sheriff of Nottinghamshire; 1890	Succeeded by Lewis Randle Starkey
Baronetage of the United Kingdom
New creation	Baronet of Sherwood Lodge and Brooke House; 1896–1915	Succeeded by Charles Seely
