= William Stanhope (1626–1703) =

Sir William Stanhope (18 December 1626 – 19 June 1703) of Shelford, Nottinghamshire was a politician who was a Member of Parliament (MP) for Nottingham from 1685 to 1687.

He was born the eldest surviving son of William Stanhope of Linby, Nottinghamshire by Anne, the daughter of Sir Bassingbourne Gawdy of West Harling, Norfolk. He succeeded his father (who had been MP for Nottingham in the Long Parliament) on his death in 1681, inheriting his father's estates at Linby and Shelford, Nottinghamshire and was knighted in 1683.

He was a captain in the Earl of Chesterfield's Foot in 1667. He was Gentleman Usher to Queen Catherine of Braganza by 1665–1685? and Groom of the Chamber in 1685?–1689. He was elected MP for Nottingham in 1685.

He died aged 76 and was buried at Shelford. He had married Catherine, the daughter of Richard Byron, 2nd Baron Byron of Rochdale but had no children. He left Linby to his cousin William Stanhope, 1st Earl of Harrington and Shelford to his father's half-brother, Philip Stanhope, who was created Baron Stanhope of Shelford.

Parliament of England
| Preceded by Richard Slater; Robert Pierrepont | Member of Parliament for Nottingham; 1685–87; With: John Beaumont | Succeeded by Francis Pierrepont; Edward Bigland |
