= John Skirrow Wright =

19th-century English reformer and activist

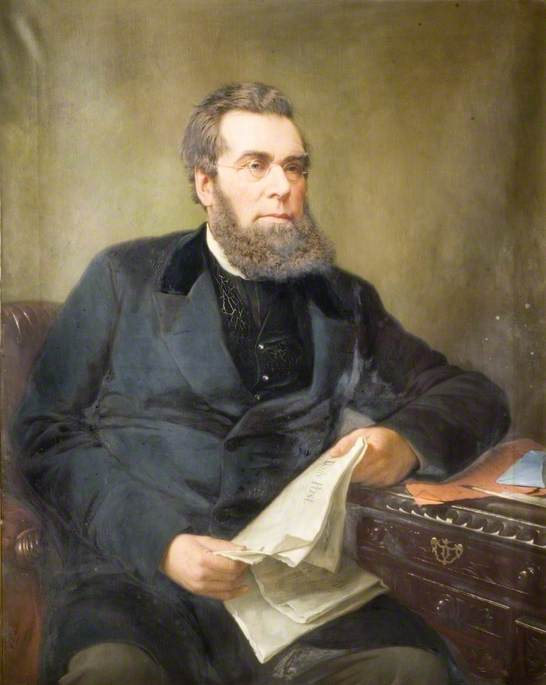
John Skirrow Wright, 1880 portrait

John Skirrow Wright (2 February 1822 – 15 April 1880) was one of the distinguished pioneers and social improvers of the 19th century in Birmingham, England; and inventor of the postal order. He was involved in many aspects of Birmingham's mid-Victorian life that were intended for the benefit of its citizens, including the General Hospital, the Chamber of Commerce, the School of Art, the Children's Hospital, the early Birmingham Hospital Saturday Fund, and the Blue Coat School.

== Life ==
Wright was born in Finsbury, London, on 2 February 1822, the son of Edward Fawcett Wright (d. 1856) and his wife, Ann, née Skirrow. Two years later, the family moved to Stourbridge, Worcestershire. In 1838 Wright moved to Birmingham in search of work, and found employment at the button manufactory of Smith and Kemp. His talents marked him for a swift ascendancy from traveller to partner in 1850, and eventually sole proprietor of the company. He was a nonconformist (like many of Birmingham's civic leaders at this time). Although he shared the profits of his enterprise, he opposed factory legislation, arguing that it interfered with the individual employer.

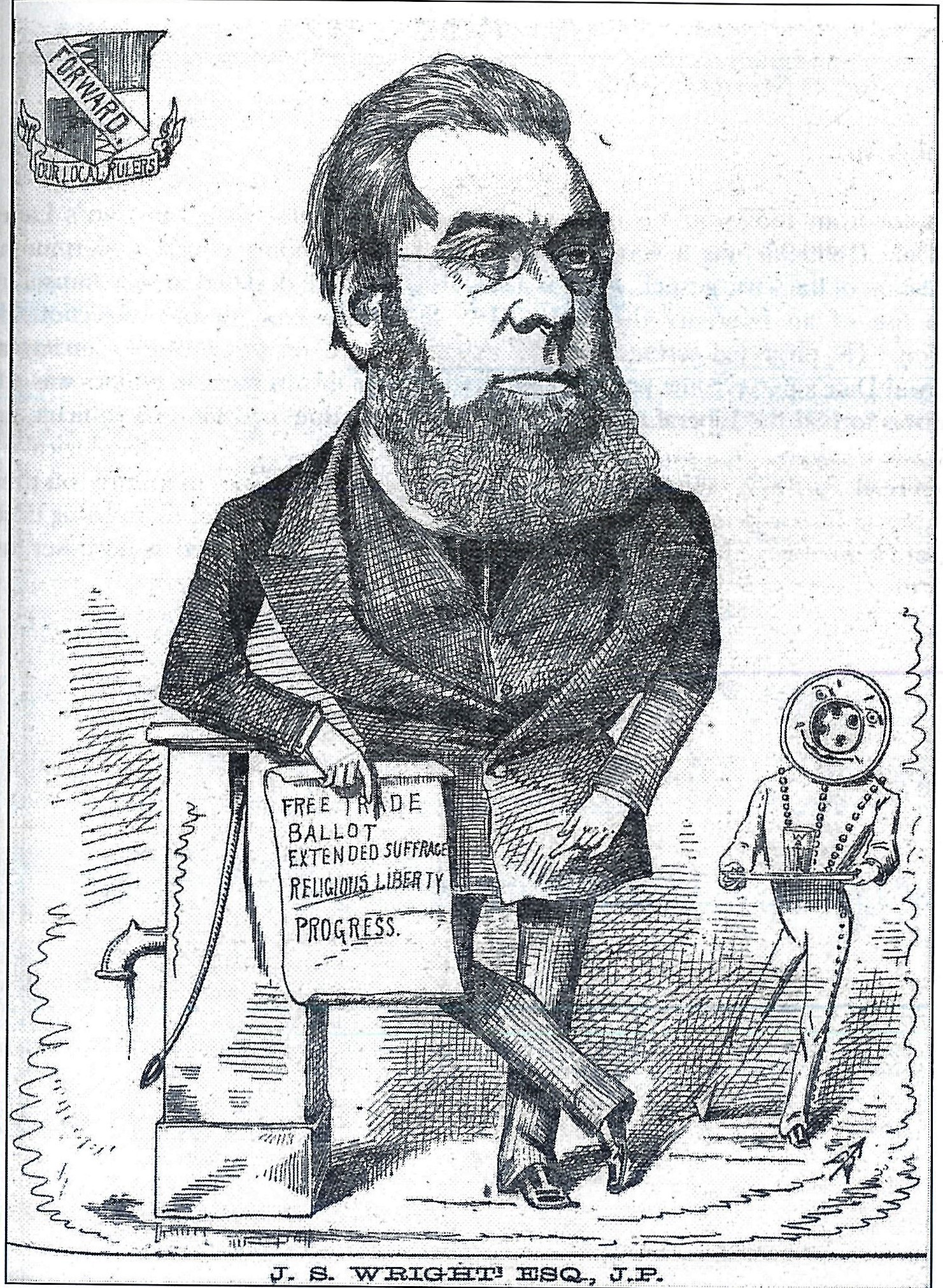
Cartoon, 1876. Wright's scroll lists his core political principles: "Free Trade; Ballot; Extended Suffrage; Religious Liberty; Progress". The footman in the background has the head of a button, in allusion to Wright's commercial roots.

While serving as President of the Birmingham Chamber of Commerce, he came up with the idea of postal orders, as an alternative to cheques, that would give the poorer classes the same facility as the wealthy to buy goods and services by post. A delegation of the Birmingham Chamber went to the annual meeting of Chambers of Commerce in London and Wright presented the idea, with details on how it would work, including all the Postal Order values proposed. London bankers were initially opposed to the idea, thinking it would affect their businesses, and the idea was rejected. However, the bankers eventually realised that the people who would use postal orders were not their customers and were therefore no threats. Consequently, at the Annual Meeting a year later Wright presented the idea again: this time it was accepted, and the Postal Order system was initiated exactly as he and the Birmingham Chamber had proposed.

He was a founder member of the Birmingham Liberal Association in 1865, and became its first chairman in 1868. In 1877 he was elected the first treasurer of the National Liberal Federation. At the 1880 general election he successfully stood for parliament as a Liberal in Nottingham. At the same time he had been helping the Liberal cause in Birmingham. However, on the evening of his success, 15 April, at a dinner held in his honour at the Council House, he died of an apoplexy, aged 58.

== Burial ==
Wright was buried at Key Hill Cemetery. The funeral took place on 19 April 1880, a warm spring day. Thousands of people lined the route, and over 300 policemen maintained order. The funeral was arranged by the Metallic Airtight Coffin Co Ltd of Great Charles Street; and the oak coffin with brass furniture was indeed metal lined. Its inscription read "John Skirrow Wright, died April 15th 1880, aged 58 years". On the lid were placed wreaths of white camellias, hyacinths, primulas, lily of the valley and maidenhair fern.

A cortege of over 20 carriages set off after the hearse to the accompaniment of the bell of St Mary's Church, Handsworth. The curtains and blinds of houses along the route were drawn, and shops had closed for the day out of respect. At the Recreation Ground in Burbury Street, a procession of representatives from the public bodies of Birmingham formed, and proceeded on foot four abreast to the cemetery gates. There it split into two to allow the hearse to pass through. The People's Chapel was reached by 3.00 pm, where the first part of the funeral service was held. Leaving to the strains of the "Dead March" from Saul, the congregation progressed to Wright's grave. As the coffin was lowered into the ground, "Rock of Ages" was sung.

== Memorial ==
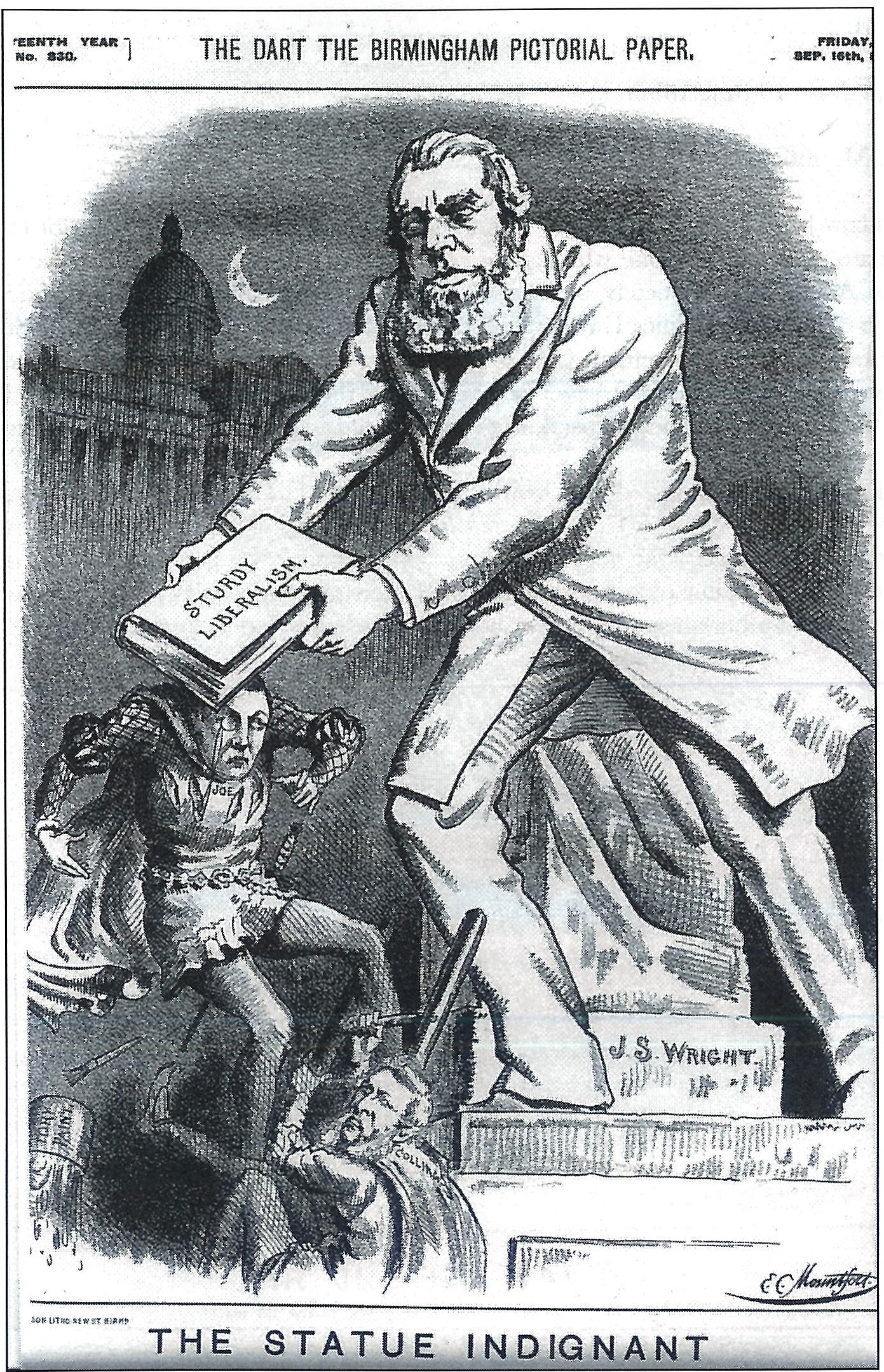
Cartoon of 1892 depicting Wright's statue beating Joseph Chamberlain with a volume marked "Sturdy Liberalism"

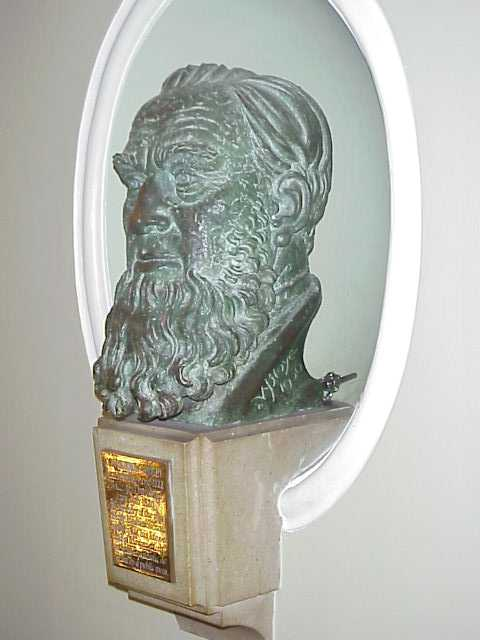
Bust of Wright by William Bloye in Birmingham's Council House

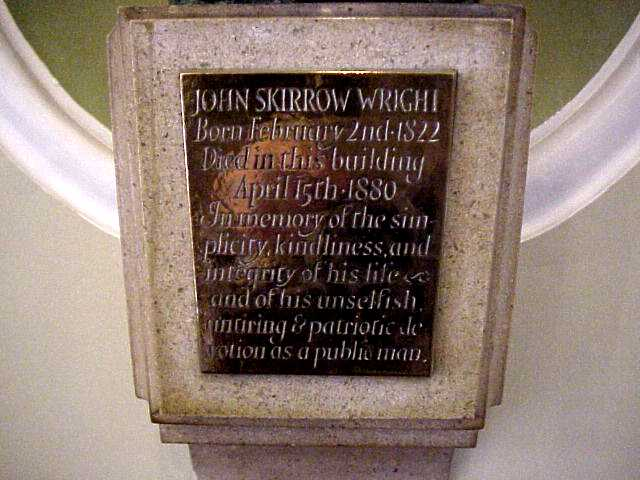
Inscription on Wright's bust

Following Wright's death, the Mayor of Birmingham, Richard Chamberlain, convened a memorial committee. Many of the town's politicians favoured a portrait to hang in the new Birmingham Museum & Art Gallery, or a bust to be placed in the Council House. Others, however, felt that the most appropriate memorial would be a public statue. A Mr Apperley wrote to the Birmingham Daily Post to argue that a bust in the Council House would rarely be seen except on special occasions. He stated: "We will have a statue if we buy it ourselves"; and made it clear that the people wanted "something whereby we can show our children the form of one we love so well and instil in them the good qualities he possessed. If ever a man deserved a statue Mr Wright does and if ever the working men want a statue to anyone they want one to him."

A decision was finally made in favour of a statue, and Francis Williamson was given the commission. It was sculpted from marble and sited in Colmore Row (in what afterwards became Victoria Square), in front of the Council House. It was unveiled by John Bright MP on 15 June 1883. The Birmingham Daily Mail reported that the pose was admirable, with Wright standing in a bold upright attitude, as was his wont when addressing an audience. The statue stood close to that to Joseph Priestley, and was joined by the statue to Queen Victoria in 1901. However, following the death of Edward VII, Priestley and Wright were moved to Chamberlain Place in 1913, so that the new memorial to Edward by Albert Toft could be placed next to his mother.

In 1914 the architectural journal The Builder published a disparaging review of Birmingham's public monuments, criticising their execution and settings. It called the Chamberlain Memorial Fountain miserable, and Chamberlain Place "squirt square"; but it found the Wright statue the least unsatisfactory example. Despite the use of such adjectives as "cold", "stiff" and "provincial", it conceded that, of all Birmingham's statues, this one displayed a simple and refined design, and found that the figure and the base displayed a certain amount of cohesion.

The statue remained in Chamberlain Place until 1951, when, as no suitable place for it could be found, it was moved to a storage depot, and eventually scrapped. However, in 1956 a bronze copy of the bust was made by William Bloye, Chairman of the Technical Committee of the Birmingham Civic Society. This was unveiled in a niche in the Council House on 13 September 1957, where it remains.

== See also ==
- Skirrow

== Sources ==
- Birmingham Chamber of Commerce record books (1879/1880/1881)
- Birmingham Daily Post Obituary April 1880
- Dixon, James (2013). "Wright, John Skirrow (1822–1880)". Oxford Dictionary of National Biography (online ed.). Oxford University Press. doi:10.1093/ref:odnb/104521. (Subscription, Wikipedia Library access or UK public library membership required.)

Parliament of the United Kingdom
Preceded by Saul Isaac; William Evelyn Denison	Member of Parliament for Nottingham; April 1880 – April 1880; With: Charles Seely	Succeeded by Charles Seely; Arnold Morley
