= John Russell, Viscount Amberley =

British politician and writer

Viscount Amberley
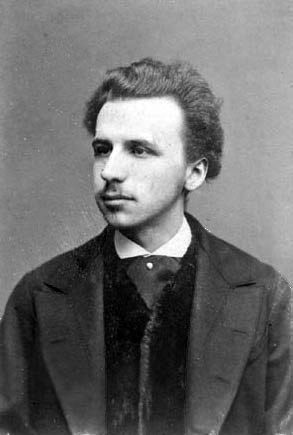

Member of Parliament for Nottingham
- In office 11 May 1866 – 11 November 1868 Serving with Ralph Bernal Osborne
- Succeeded by: Robert Juckes Clifton; Charles Ichabod Wright

Personal details
- Born: John Russell; 10 December 1842
- Died: 9 January 1876 (aged 33)
- Party: Liberal
- Spouse: Katharine Stanley (m. 1864; died 1874)
- Children: 4, including Frank and Bertrand
- Parent(s): John Russell, 1st Earl Russell; Frances Elliot-Murray-Kynynmound
- Education: Harrow School; University of Edinburgh; Trinity College, Cambridge

John Russell, Viscount Amberley (10 December 1842 – 9 January 1876) was a British politician and writer. He was the eldest son of John Russell, who twice served as Prime Minister of the United Kingdom, and he was the father of the philosopher Bertrand Russell. Amberley is known for his unorthodox views on religion and for his active support of birth control and women's suffrage, which contributed to the end of his short career as Liberal Member of Parliament.

== Childhood and education ==
John Russell was born on 10 December 1842 at Chesham Place, London, the first son of Lord John Russell, himself the son of the 6th Duke of Bedford. His mother was Lord Russell's second wife, Lady Frances, daughter of the 2nd Earl of Minto. In 1846, his father became Prime Minister of the United Kingdom and served as such twice. Due to Lord John's elevation to peerage as Earl Russell in 1861, his son and heir apparent became known as Viscount Amberley.

After a home education, he was sent to Harrow School. He was an exceptionally studious boy and his performance at school pleased his father. He later attended the University of Edinburgh and Trinity College, Cambridge. At Cambridge, he formed a close and lasting friendship with T. J. Cobden-Sanderson, who shared his irreligious views. Both left Cambridge without taking a degree; Amberley's departure in February 1863 was due to his dislike for Cambridge's social tone and focus on mathematics.

== Views and politics ==
Rejecting the divinity of Christ in the early 1860s, Amberley wrote on his 21st birthday, "I am therefore at the present moment what is called a 'Deist'." In 1864, he embarked on a comparative study of religions and started writing An Analysis of Religious Belief. He published the first part of an article on "The Church of England as a Religious Body" in December 1866 and the second in February 1867, arguing that the clergy should consider all theological doctrines equally because the Church of England was a national church and tithes were paid by all citizens, regardless of their personal convictions.

Amberley was pressured by his father to take up politics, and his friend, the philosopher John Stuart Mill MP, expected him to become his political heir. Following an unsuccessful 1865 candidature at Leeds, he was elected Member of Parliament for Nottingham on 11 May 1866. A progressive Liberal, he served until 17 November 1868. Amberley's religious views presented a great obstacle to his political career, with even Liberal clergymen angered by his refusal to observe Sunday. He also advocated birth control as means of countering overpopulation and public health issues, for which he was accused of depreciating marriage, supporting abortion, and insulting physicians. This stance cost him a seat in the South Devon election in 1868. Following this defeat, he gave up his parliamentary career, but continued to write and speak in favour of women's suffrage.

Quitting politics left Amberley with more time to spend researching religions and publishing articles. His parents and siblings tolerated his unorthodox ideas but disagreed with them. They did, however, denounce his affiliation with Positivism. He joined the Workmen's Peace Association, formed in 1870, but opposed the idea of disarmament, stating that it "would most likely lead to war".

== Personal life ==
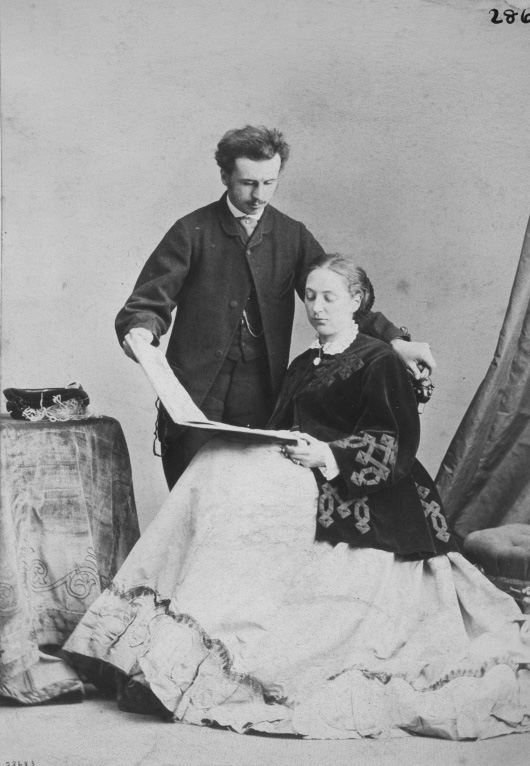
Albumen print of Lord and Lady Amberley made by William Notman in Montreal in 1867 and currently owned by McCord Museum

In November 1860, the black-haired and short statured Lord Amberley met and fell in love with Janet Chambers, daughter of the publisher Robert Chambers. The affection remained strong until her death in 1863, but it does not appear probable that Amberley ever contemplated marrying her.

He met Katharine Stanley in early 1864. Lord and Lady Russell disliked her parents, the politician Lord Stanley of Alderley and the women's education campaigner Lady Stanley of Alderley. The couple was thus prohibited from seeing each other for six months, but married immediately after the separation on 8 November 1864 at Alderley, Cheshire. In sharp contrast to her serious and shy husband, Lady Amberley was remarkably vivacious, and their brief marriage was very happy.

Amberley had two sons and twin daughters, one of whom was stillborn. The eldest child, Frank, was born nine months after their marriage. Rachel Lucretia and her stillborn sister were born prematurely on 2 March 1868, at St. Martin, London, shortly after the couple's return from a tour of North America; the surviving daughter was named after Lucretia Mott, the social reformer whom the couple had met in Boston. In 1870, Lord and Lady Amberley bought Ravenscroft, a country home near Chepstow in Monmouthshire, where he was a magistrate, and spent their time enjoying nature and domestic life. Their youngest and most prominent child, Bertrand, was born in 1872. Amberley asked John Stuart Mill to be Bertrand's secular godfather, and Mill accepted.

Through Mill, Lord Amberley met Douglas Spalding, a lawyer by profession and amateur biologist whom he employed as a tutor for his sons. Amberley encouraged him to continue his research on imprinting at his home, although his guests were terrified to see chickens roaming around the drawing-room and library. Spalding suffered from tuberculosis and was thus considered unfit for marriage. Lord Amberley felt that there was nevertheless no reason to condemn Spalding to celibacy and, after a discussion with his wife, allowed them to engage in a sexual relationship.

== Widowerhood and death ==
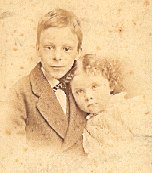
Frank and Rachel Russell

Amberley experienced his first epileptic seizure in 1873. Concerned for his health, Lord and Lady Amberley decided to spend the winter in Rome and took Spalding and Frank with them. When they returned to England, in May 1874, Frank was diagnosed with diphtheria, but was nursed back to health by Lady Amberley and her sister Maude. Rachel contracted the disease on their return to Ravenscroft, and was soon followed by Lady Amberley. On 27 June, Lord Amberley informed his mother-in-law that his wife's life was in danger. The next day, he wrote again to Lady Stanley, "You will know from the doctor that all is over. I cannot say more. It ended this morning early. I am too wretched to write more." Rachel, his favourite, lived until 3 July. When she died, Amberley wrote to his mother that he had lost "two greatest treasures in this world".

Amberley, by nature physically weak and sombre, was left without a wish to live. He had Lady Amberley's body cremated and her ashes interred in the grounds of their home without a religious ceremony, a decision that was seen as outrageous. Deeply depressed, he left their surviving children in the care of Spalding and the servants, and decided to finish An Analysis of Religious Belief in honour of his wife.

He died of bronchitis at their home on 9 January 1876. According to his wishes, he was buried alongside his wife and daughter on 13 January. His parents, however, had all the remains moved to the Russell family vault at St Michael's, Chenies.

In his will, Amberley named Douglas Spalding and T. J. Cobden-Sanderson as Frank and Bertrand's guardians, not wishing his children to be raised as Christians, but Lord and Lady Russell successfully contested the stipulation and assumed full guardianship. The deeply pious Lady Russell, notwithstanding her undoubted disapproval of its content, made sure that her son's book was published a month after his death. She wrote in her introduction to An Analysis of Religious Belief, that while some would find "their most cherished beliefs questioned or contempted" by the book, they should recognise that her son wrote it in what to him was "the cause of goodness, nobleness, love, truth, and of the mental progress of mankind." Both of Amberley's sons eventually succeeded to the earldom.

Parliament of the United Kingdom
Preceded by Sir Robert Juckes Clifton; Samuel Morley	Member of Parliament for Nottingham; 1866 – 1868; With: Ralph Bernal Osborne	Succeeded by Sir Robert Juckes Clifton; Charles Ichabod Wright
