= Cleddon Hall =

Country house in Monmouthshire, Wales

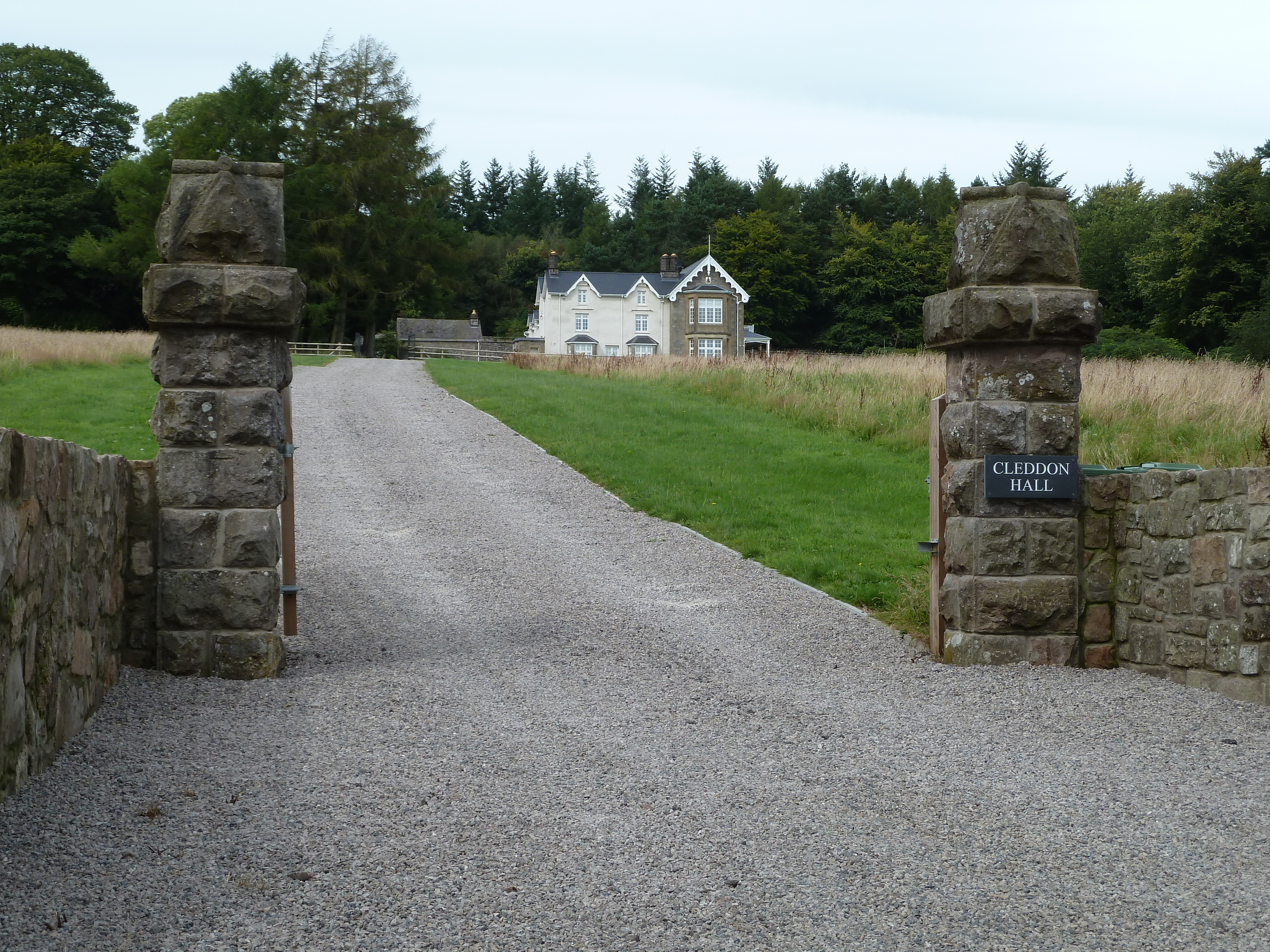
- Birthplace of Bertrand Russell

- Location within Monmouthshire
- 51.7335°N 2.7008°W
- Type: House
- Location: Trellech, Monmouthshire, Wales

Site notes
- Architectural style: Tudorbethan
- Governing body: Privately owned

Cleddon Hall, formerly known as Ravenscroft, is a 19th-century Victorian country house in Trellech, Monmouthshire, Wales. In the later 19th century it was owned by Lord and Lady Amberley, and their youngest son, the philosopher Bertrand Russell, was born at the hall on 18 May 1872.

== History and description ==
Cleddon Hall stands in the Wye Valley, 6 mi (10 km) south of Monmouth, between the village of Trellech and the A466 at Llandogo. In 1870 the hall, then known as Ravenscroft, was purchased by John Russell, Viscount Amberley and his wife Katharine. John Russell was the eldest son of Earl Russell, twice Prime Minister of the United Kingdom, while Katharine was the daughter of the 2nd Baron Stanley. Russell and his wife were highly unconventional for their times. The antiquarian and genealogist Joseph Bradney, in his A History of Monmouthshire from the Coming of the Normans into Wales down to the Present Time, described the couple as "possessed of views on life in strange discord to those of the simple-minded people among whom they settled". (Note: Bradney's description of Lord Amberley descended into rudeness; "Lord Amberley was a man of remarkably short stature, being only five feet in height, and his intellect was similarly contracted".) Religious sceptics, and supporters of women's rights and abortion, they lived in an open marriage at the hall with their children's tutor, Douglas Spalding. On 18 May 1872 their son, Bertrand was born at Cleddon. Within three years of his birth, his parents were dead and he was sent to live with his grandparents in London.

Although initially unconvinced when her husband suggested buying the estate, Katharine Russell came to appreciate Cleddon, becoming "quite enchanted with the wildness and beauty of the place". In his autobiography published in 1967, her son described the hall's isolated setting as "very lonely". Cleddon is not listed by Cadw and the architectural historian John Newman does not mention the house in his Gwent/Monmouthshire volume of the Pevsner Buildings of Wales series. The house is recorded by the Royal Commission on the Ancient and Historical Monuments of Wales in their National Monuments of Wales (Coflein) database. Cleddon Hall remains a private home.

== Sources ==
- Bradney, Joseph Alfred (1992) [1913]. The Hundred of Trelech. A History of Monmouthshire from the Coming of the Normans into Wales down to the Present Time. Vol. 2. London: Academy Books. ISBN 1-873361-16-5.
- Newman, John (2000). Gwent/Monmouthshire. The Buildings of Wales. London: Penguin. ISBN 0-14-071053-1.
- Shuttleworth, Kay (2016). "Science and Periodicals: Animal Instinct and Whispering Machines". In Juliet John (ed.). Oxford Handbook of Victorian Literary Culture. Oxford: Oxford University Press. ISBN 978-0-199-59373-6.
