= John Beaumont (died 1701) =

English soldier and politician

John Beaumont (c. 1636 – 3 July 1701) was an English soldier at the time of the Glorious Revolution and politician who sat in the House of Commons between 1685 and 1695.

Beaumont was born at Burton, Lincolnshire, the son of Sapcote Beaumont, 2nd Viscount Beaumont of Swords and his wife Bridget Monson. He was educated at school at Market Bosworth and was admitted at Christ's College, Cambridge aged 17 on 3 November 1653. He attended King Charles II in exile and was commissioned a captain in Our Holland Regiment, becoming lieutenant-colonel by 1685.

In 1685, Beaumont was elected Member of Parliament (MP) for Nottingham and held the seat until 1689.

In 1688, Beaumont's regiment was marched to Portsmouth under the Duke of Berwick. Beaumont was one of the officers involved in Portsmouth Captains affair when they refused to accept Irish recruits into the regiment against King James instructions for all regiments to accept a quota of Irish troopers. On 10 September 1688 the officers were brought before a council of war and stripped of their rank.

Beaumont joined William of Orange at Torbay and on 31 December 1688 and was rewarded with promotion to colonel of the regiment. Beaumont was elected MP for Hastings in August 1689 and held the seat until 1695.

Beaumont went with his regiment to Ireland, where it landed on 13 August 1689 and took part in the Siege of Carrickfergus. It went on to Dundalk and was present at the Battle of the Boyne in July 1690. It also took part in the unsuccessful siege of Limerick and was part of the expedition under John Churchill that captured Cork and Kinsale. The regiment remained stationed in Ireland in 1691, taking part in the second siege of Limerick; it returned to England in February 1692. Beaumont also served in Flanders. He became Governor of Dover Castle. He left parliament and resigned his commission in 1695.

In May 1695 after a quarrel in Parliament, Beaumont fought a duel with Sir William Forrester and disarmed him.

Beaumont married, firstly, Felicia Mary Fermor, daughter of Sir Hatton Fermor, and secondly Philippa Carew, daughter of Sir Nicholas Carew. He had no children.

Parliament of England
Preceded by Richard Slater; Robert Pierrepont	Member of Parliament for Nottingham; 1685–89; With: William Stanhope	Succeeded by Francis Pierrepont; Edward Bigland
Preceded by Thomas Mun; John Ashburnham	Member of Parliament for Hastings; 1689–95; With: Thomas Mun 1689–90; Peter Gott 1690–95	Succeeded by John Pulteney; Robert Austen
Military offices
Preceded by James FitzJames, 1st Duke of Berwick	Colonel of Princess Anne of Denmark's Regiment of Foot; 1688–1695	Succeeded by John Richmond Webb
