= Anne Newport, Baroness Torrington =

British aristocrat and social reformer

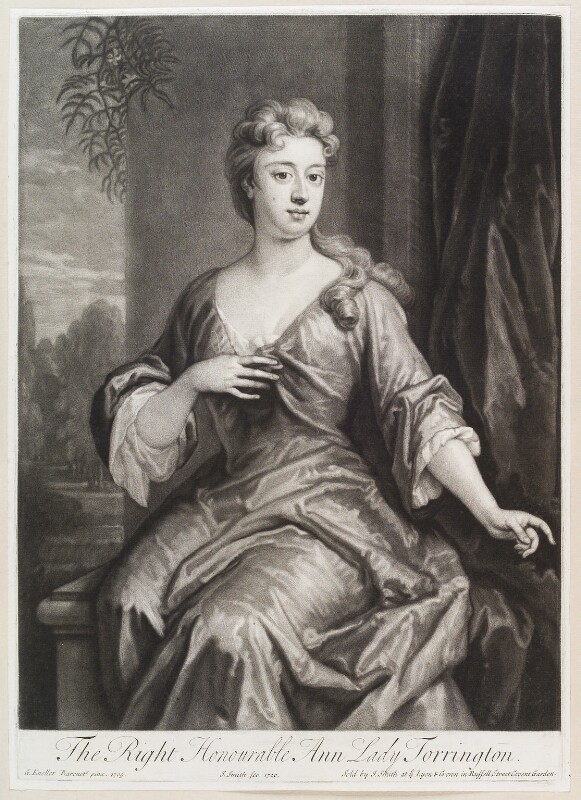
Anne Newport, Lady Torrington (wife of Thomas Newport, 1st Baron Torrington) by and published by John Smith, after Sir Godfrey Kneller, Bt, mezzotint, 1720 (1709) NPG D11609

Anne Newport, Baroness Torrington (born Anne Pierrepont, ? – 1735) was an eighteenth-century British aristocrat and social reformer.

She was one of two daughters of Robert Pierrepont and Anne Murray. Her brother was politician Francis Pierrepont. Her cousin was writer and poet Lady Mary Wortley Montagu.

Anne Pierrepont married Thomas Newport, Baron Torrington, a barrister and Lord of the Treasury, on 8 July 1709. The couple made their home at Richmond House in Twickenham. Baroness Torrington would continue to live there after her husband died in 1719.

On 14 April 1730, along with her friend, Frances Byron, Baroness Torrington was one of the signatories to the Ladies' Petition for the Establishment of a Foundling Hospital, which would be presented by Thomas Coram to King George II in 1735. The society women who signed the petition were considered to have made the hospital "one of the most fashionable charities of the day".

Baroness Torrington died in 1735.

The extensive collection of fine art developed by the couple was inherited by Thomas' brother, Lord Bradford. It is now on display at Weston Park in Shropshire.
