= William Evelyn Denison =

Captain William Evelyn Denison DL, JP (25 February 1843 – 24 September 1916) was a British Army officer and a Conservative Party politician. He owned an estate in Ossington, Nottinghamshire where he held several local offices as well as sitting in the House of Commons from 1874 to 1880.

== Early life ==
Denison was the eldest son of Sir William T. Denison (1804–71), a British colonial governor and brother of Speaker Evelyn Denison. His mother was Caroline née Hornby, daughter of Admiral Sir Phipps Hornby. At the age of 3, he moved to Van Diemen's Land, where his father had been appointed Lieutenant-Governor. In 1854, Sir William was promoted to Governor of New South Wales, and the family moved to Sydney.

William was educated at Eton and then at the Royal Military Academy in Woolwich. In February 1864, he was commissioned as a lieutenant in the Royal Artillery, and in September 1876, he was promoted to the rank of captain. He retired from the Royal Artillery in 1878.

== Political career ==
Denison was elected at the 1874 general election as a Member of Parliament (MP) for Nottingham, when the Conservatives took both the city's parliamentary seats from the Liberals. Denison did not stand again in Nottingham at the 1880 general election, having been asked instead to contest the Northern division of Nottinghamshire, where he was unsuccessful.

He was appointed as Deputy Lieutenant of Nottinghamshire in March 1875. He was nominated as a High Sheriff of Nottinghamshire in November 1892, and again in November 1894, and appointed to the post in March 1895.

Denison was also a county magistrate (Justice of the Peace), chairman of the bench of magistrates at Newark, and an Alderman of Nottinghamshire County Council.

== Cricket ==
Denison was a member of the Nottinghamshire County Cricket Club, of which he was president in 1891. The following year he was president of the Marylebone Cricket Club.

== Residence ==
When his uncle Viscount Ossington died childless in 1873, Denison inherited the Ossington Hall estate. On his own death in 1916, the estates passed to his son William Frank Evelyn Denison, who died two years later, when the estates reverted to Lady Elinor Denison, widow of W.E Denison.

Parliament of the United Kingdom
Preceded by Charles Seely; Auberon Herbert	Member of Parliament for Nottingham; 1874 – 1880; With: Saul Isaac	Succeeded by Charles Seely; John Skirrow Wright
