= Robert German (MP) =

English politician (??–1402)

Robert German (died 1402) was an English politician.

He was a member (MP) of the parliament of England for Nottingham from 1377 to 1397.
