= Charles Paget (politician) =

British politician

Charles Paget MP
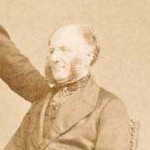
- Born: 1799
- Died: August 1873 (aged 73–74); Filey
- Occupation: Politician
- Spouse: two

Charles Paget MP (1799 – August 1873) was a British politician.

Paget came from an old Leicestershire family. He represented Nottingham as a Liberal from 1856 (on the promotion of the former MP to Lord Belper) to 1865. He lived at the grange in Ruddington, five miles from Nottingham, which he built in 1828.

He had six children by his first wife, Eliza, who died in 1834. He and his second wife were drowned by a freak wave at Filey.

== Sources ==
Parliament of the United Kingdom
Preceded by Edward Strutt; John Walter (third)	Member of Parliament for Nottingham; 1856 – 1865; With: John Walter (third) 1856–1859; John Mellor 1859–1861; Sir Robert Juckes Clifton from 1861–1865	Succeeded by Sir Robert Juckes Clifton; Samuel Morley
Honorary titles
Preceded by Thomas Dickinson Hall	High Sheriff of Nottinghamshire; 1844	Succeeded by William Hodgson Barrow
