= Douglas Spalding =

British biologist

- Born: 14 July 1841; Islington, London
- Died: 31 October 1877 (aged 36); Dunkirk, France
- Education: University of Aberdeen
- Known for: Studying animal behaviour, especially what is now known as imprinting
- Scientific career
- Fields: Philosophy, literature, law, animal behaviour
- Workplaces: Cleddon Hall, Monmouthshire
- Patrons: Alexander Bain, John Russell, Viscount Amberley

Douglas Alexander Spalding (14 July 1841 – 1877) was a British biologist who studied animal behaviour and worked in the home of Viscount Amberley.

== Biography ==
Spalding was born in Islington in London in 1841, the only son of Jessey Fraser and Alexander Mitchell Spalding, office clerk. Not long after his birth, his parents moved to Aberdeenshire, Scotland where they had previously lived. While he was working as a slater in Aberdeen, the philosopher Alexander Bain persuaded the University of Aberdeen to allow Spalding to attend courses without charge. He studied philosophy and literature, and after a year left for London. He trained as a lawyer. But when he contracted tuberculosis, he travelled in Europe in hopes of finding a cure, and in Avignon met John Stuart Mill and through him Viscount Amberley (son of the former British prime minister Lord John Russell, by then 1st Earl Russell). He became tutor to Viscount Amberley's children at Cleddon Hall, Monmouthshire, including perhaps the young Bertrand Russell, and also carried on an intermittent affair with Viscountess Amberley. After the Lord Amberley's death in 1876, Spalding returned to the continent and died on 31 October 1877 at Dunkirk, on his way to the Mediterranean coast for the sake of his health.

Spalding carried out some experiments on animal behaviour, and discovered the phenomenon now known as imprinting, later rediscovered by Oskar Heinroth, then studied at length and popularised by Konrad Lorenz. He was greatly ahead of his time in his recognition of the importance of the interaction between learning and instinct in determining behaviour, and in his use of the experimental method in studying behaviour. Although his work is little known nowadays, its importance is recognised by historians of psychology; the biologist J. B. S. Haldane reprinted Spalding's essay "On Instinct" in 1954 to clarify the history of the subject.

More recently, lack of familiarity with Darwin's exposition of transitional habits in On the Origin of Species has led some scientists to claim that, in 1873, Spalding was first to identify the process which is now known as the Baldwin effect, not Baldwin in 1896.

== Notes ==
- Boakes, R. A. (1984). From Darwin to behaviorism. Cambridge: Cambridge University Press.
- Gray, P. H. (1967). Spalding and his influence on research in developmental behavior. Journal of the History of the Behavioral Sciences, 3, 168-179.
- Gray, P. H. (1968). Prerequisite to an analysis of behaviorism: The conscious automaton theory from Spalding to William James. Journal of the History of the Behavioral Sciences, 4, 365-376.
- Griffiths, P. E. (2004). Instinct in the ‘50s: The British reception of Konrad Lorenz's theory of instinctive behavior. Biology and Philosophy, 19 (also available online).
- Haldane, J. B. S. (1954). Introducing Douglas Spalding. British Journal for Animal Behaviour, 2, 1.
- Spalding, D. A. (1873). Instinct. With original observations on young animals. Macmillan's Magazine, 27, 282-293.
- Spalding, D. A. (1872). On instinct. Nature, 6, 485-486.
