= Robert Howden (MP) =

English politician

Robert Howden (died ca. 1397) was an English politician.

He was a member (MP) of the parliament of England for Nottingham in May 1382, February 1383 and 1386.
