= John Alestre =

English politician

John Alestre (died 1431) was an English politician. He sat as MP for Nottingham in March 1416, May 1421, 1422, and 1425 and mayor of Nottingham in 1409 till 1410, 1414 till 1415, 1420 till 1421, 1426 till 1427, and 1430 till his death.

He also served as bailiff of Nottingham from Michaelmas 1402 till 1403, and commissioner of inquiry in Nottinghamshire in January 1424 concerning liability to contribute to repairs of the bridges at Nottingham over the Leen.

He was the son and heir of Nicholas Alestre. He married a woman named Cecily and had two sons (including Thomas) and two daughters.
