= David Heath (radical) =

David William Heath (1827 or 1828 – 24 September 1880) was a British Chartist and radical politician.

Born in Nantwich on an unknown date, Heath became clerk to a solicitor in 1844. This proved successful, and in 1851 he moved to Nottingham, becoming clerk to the borough coroner. This position enabled him to train as a solicitor in his own right, and he qualified in 1861. He formed a partnership with John Buttery, a Tory agent, with Heath specialising in representing trade unions and companies.

Heath was a keen temperance activist, a founder of the Nottingham Christian Temperance Society in 1851, and also of the Nottingham branch of the United Kingdom Alliance. He was also active in the Nottingham Mechanics' Institute, taking a particular interest in debates held there.

In the late 1850s, Heath became active in the Chartist movement and, in particular, of Ernest Charles Jones. He helped organise Jones' unsuccessful candidacies in Nottingham at the 1857 and 1859 UK general elections, then in the 1861 by-election he backed independent liberal Robert Juckes Clifton. This inspired Heath to enter politics himself, and in 1863 he won the St Ann's ward on Nottingham Town Council as an independent liberal.

During the mid-1860s, Heath was active in the Reform League, and he was elected as County Coroner with the backing of league members. He was also active in the Nine Hours Movement. He stood in the 1874 UK general election in Nottingham as a Liberal-Labour candidate, with the sponsorship of the local trades council. The election proved close-fought, but Heath could take only fifth place. By this point, Heath's health was failing, and he resigned from the council in 1875, dying in 1880.
