= Michael Purefoy =

Michael Purefoy (1562–1627) was an English politician who sat in the House of Commons in 1584 and from 1621 to 1622.

Purefoy was the son of Thomas Purefoy of Caldecot and his wife Elizabeth Bradshaw, daughter of Robert Bradshaw of Morborne, Huntingdonshire. He matriculated from Peterhouse, Cambridge in 1576 and received BA from Magdalene College, Cambridge in 1582 and MA in 1585. In 1584, he was elected Member of Parliament for Clitheroe. He was incorporated at Oxford University in 1598 and was a deputy official of the archdeaconry of Nottinghamshire from 1598. In 1521 he was elected MP for Nottingham.

Purefoy died unmarried in 1627 and was buried in Caldecote church, where a monument was erected by his cousin Gamaliel Purefoy.

Parliament of England
Preceded by William Wynter; Thomas Docwray	Member of Parliament for Clitheroe; 1584; With: Alexander Fisher	Succeeded by Edmund Poley; John Walmesley
Preceded by William Gregory	Member of Parliament for Nottingham; 1621–1622; With: George Lascelles	Succeeded by John Byron; Sir Charles Cavendish
