= Francis Pierrepont (died c. 1693) =

English politician

Francis Pierrepont (10 March 1662 – ca. 1693) was an English politician.

He was the eldest son of Robert Pierrepont, MP and Anne Murray. One of his sisters was Anne Newport, Baroness Torrington.

He was a Justice of the Peace (JP) for Nottinghamshire from 1689 to his death and a deputy-lieutenant for the county from 1689 to his death. He was also elected Member of Parliament (MP) for Nottingham from 1689 to 1690.

He died unmarried around the age of 31.

Parliament of England
Preceded by John Beaumont; Sir William Stanhope	Member of Parliament for Nottingham; 1689–1690; With: Edward Bigland	Succeeded by Charles Hutchinson; Richard Slater
