= Robert Pierrepont (MP) =

English politician

Robert Pierrepont (ca. 1638 – 22 September 1681) was an English politician who sat in the House of Commons from 1660 to 1681.

Pierrepont was the eldest son of Hon. Francis Pierrepont of Nottingham and his wife Elizabeth Bray, daughter of Thomas Bray of Eyam, Derbyshire. He was admitted at Emmanuel College, Cambridge on 3 April 1652 and migrated to Christ's College, Cambridge on 14 April 1652. He travelled abroad in 1654 and succeeded his father in 1658.

Pierrepont was elected Member of Parliament (MP) for Nottingham for the Convention Parliament in 1660 after the selected candidate, John Hutchinson was evicted as a regicide. He was re-elected MP for Nottingham in 1661 for the Cavalier Parliament and was also elected in the two elections of 1679 for the First and Second Exclusion Parliaments. In 1681 he was elected again as MP for Nottingham, but died later in that year.

Pierrepont married by licence dated 27 March 1661 Anne Murray, daughter of Henry Murray of Berkhampstead, Hertfordshire a groom of the bedchamber to Charles I. They had three sons and two daughters, including Francis Pierrepont (died c. 1693) and Anne Newport, Baroness Torrington.

Parliament of England
Preceded by Arthur Stanhope; John Hutchinson	Member of Parliament for Nottingham; 1660–1685; With: Arthur Stanhope 1660–1679; Richard Slater 1679–1685	Succeeded by John Beaumont; Sir William Stanhope
