= Saul Isaac =

English businessman and politician

Member of Parliament for Nottingham
- In office 1874–1880

Personal details
- Born: 1823 England
- Died: late 1903
- Political party: Conservative Party
- Occupation: Businessman
- Known for: First Jewish MP elected as a Conservative

Saul Isaac (1823 – late 1903) was an English businessman and Conservative Party politician. He was the first Jew to be elected to the House of Commons (1874 – 1880) as a Conservative candidate.

Isaac was a partner in the army contracting business run by his older brother Samuel (1812–1886), which became the largest European supplier of materials to the Confederate States during the American Civil War.

He was elected at the 1874 general election as a member of parliament (MP) for Nottingham, when the Conservatives took both the city's parliamentary seats from the Liberals. The election return describes him as a colliery proprietor, of Colwick Hall, Nottinghamshire. Isaac was defeated at the 1880 general election, and was unsuccessful when he contested Finsbury Central at the 1885 general election.

Parliament of the United Kingdom
Preceded by Charles Seely; Auberon Herbert	Member of Parliament for Nottingham; 1874 – 1880; With: William Evelyn Denison	Succeeded by Charles Seely; John Skirrow Wright
