= 1869 Nottingham by-election =

UK parliamentary by-election

The 1869 Nottingham by-election was fought on 16 June 1869. The by-election was fought due to the death of the incumbent MP of the Liberal Party, Sir Robert Juckes Clifton. It was won by the Liberal candidate Charles Seely.
