= John Mellor (judge) =

English judge and politician

The Right Honourable Sir John Mellor
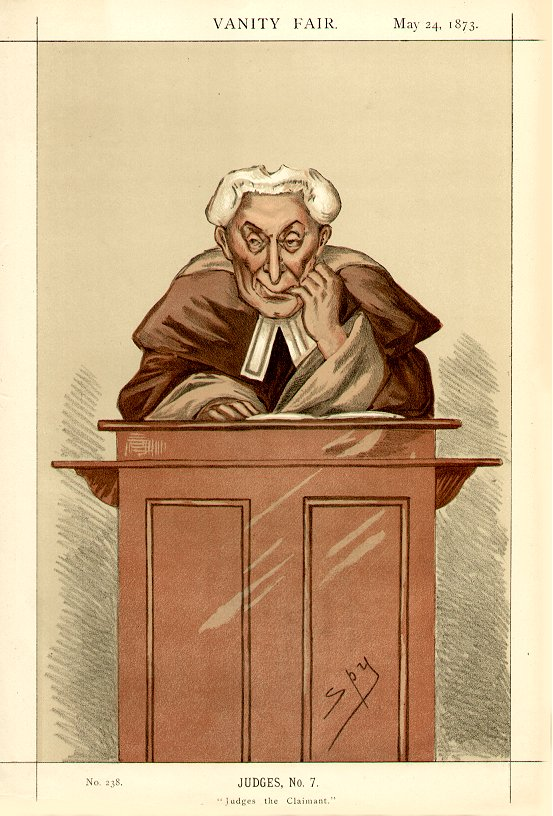
- "Judges the Claimant"; Mellor as caricatured by Spy (Leslie Ward) in Vanity Fair, May 1873

Justice of the High Court
- Succeeded by: Sir Charles Bowen

Sir John Mellor, PC (1 January 1809 – 26 April 1887) was an English judge and Member of Parliament.

== Life ==
Mellor was born in Hollinwood, Oldham and raised in Leicester, where his father was mayor and a Justice of the Peace.

As a young man, his Unitarian beliefs prevented Mellor attending university. He entered law, joined the midland circuit, and practised at Leicester borough and Warwick sessions, at assizes, and at the parliamentary bar. He became a Queen's Counsel in 1833. Following failed attempts in 1852 (at Warwick) and 1857 (at Coventry) he was elected to Parliament to represent Great Yarmouth in 1857, and Nottingham in 1859. He was appointed to the Queen's Bench in 1861 and knighted in 1862.

Mellor was one of the two judges at the special commission set up in Manchester in 1867 to try those accused of the murder of Police Sergeant Charles Brett.

He was one of three judges at the 188-day long trial in 1873 of Arthur Orton, the Tichborne claimant. In his description of the case, James Beresford Atlay described him as 'second to none amongst the Common Law judges'. Hamilton notes he 'often amused the jury with his dry humour'.

Mellor retired in 1879 and was raised to the Privy Council. He died at his London house in 1887 and was buried at Kingsdown, Kent.

== Family ==
Mellor and his wife Elizabeth (née Moseley) had eight sons. Sir James Robert Mellor (1839–1926), the third son, was noted as a lawyer and polo player.

== Arms ==
Coat of arms of John Mellor
Crest A blackbird as in the arms. Escutcheon Argent three blackbirds Proper. Motto Semper Constans Et Fidelis

Parliament of the United Kingdom
Preceded by William Torrens McCullagh; Edward Watkin	Member of Parliament for Great Yarmouth; 1857 – 1859; With: Adolphus William Young	Succeeded by Sir Edmund Lacon, Bt; Sir Henry Stracey, Bt
Preceded by John Walter; Charles Paget	Member of Parliament for Nottingham; 1859 – 1861; With: Charles Paget	Succeeded by Sir Robert Juckes Clifton, Bt; Charles Paget
