= Nicholas Alestre =

English politician

Nicholas Alestre (fl. 1393–1422) was an English politician. He sat as MP for Nottingham in 1393.

He also served as bailiff of Nottingham from Michaelmas 1397 till 1398.

He married a woman called Emma and had one son, John.
