= Edwards-Moss baronets =

Baronetcy in the Baronetage of the United Kingdom

- Escutcheon of the Edwards-Moss baronets, of Roby Hall
- Creation date: 1868
- Status: dormant
- Motto: En la rose je fleurie, I flourish in the rose

The Edwards-Moss Baronetcy, of Roby Hall in the parish of Huyton-cum-Roby in the County Palatine of Lancaster, is a title in the Baronetage of the United Kingdom. It was created on 23 December 1868 for Thomas Edwards-Moss. Born Thomas Moss, he had assumed by Royal licence the additional surname of Edwards in 1851, having married Amy Charlotte, daughter and heiress of Richard Edwards of Roby Hall, Lancashire. The presumed fifth Baronet does not use his title. As of 2021 he had not successfully proven his succession, and is therefore not on the Official Roll of the Baronetage, with the baronetcy considered dormant.

== Edwards-Moss baronets, of Roby Hall (1868) ==
- Sir Thomas Edwards-Moss, 1st Baronet (1811–1890)
- Sir John Edwards Edwards-Moss, 2nd Baronet (1850–1935)
- Sir Thomas Edwards-Moss, 3rd Baronet (1874–1960)
- Sir John Herbert Theodore Edwards-Moss, 4th Baronet (1913–1988)
- David John Edwards-Moss, presumed 5th Baronet (born 1955). He does not use the title.

The heir presumptive is the present holder's brother Peter Michael Edwards-Moss (born 1957). The heir presumptive's heir apparent is his son John Herbert Theodore Edwards-Moss (born 1992).
