= Charles Ichabod Wright =

British banker and politician

Charles Ichabod Wright (18 September 1828 – 9 May 1905) was a British banker and Conservative politician who sat in the House of Commons from 1868 to 1870.

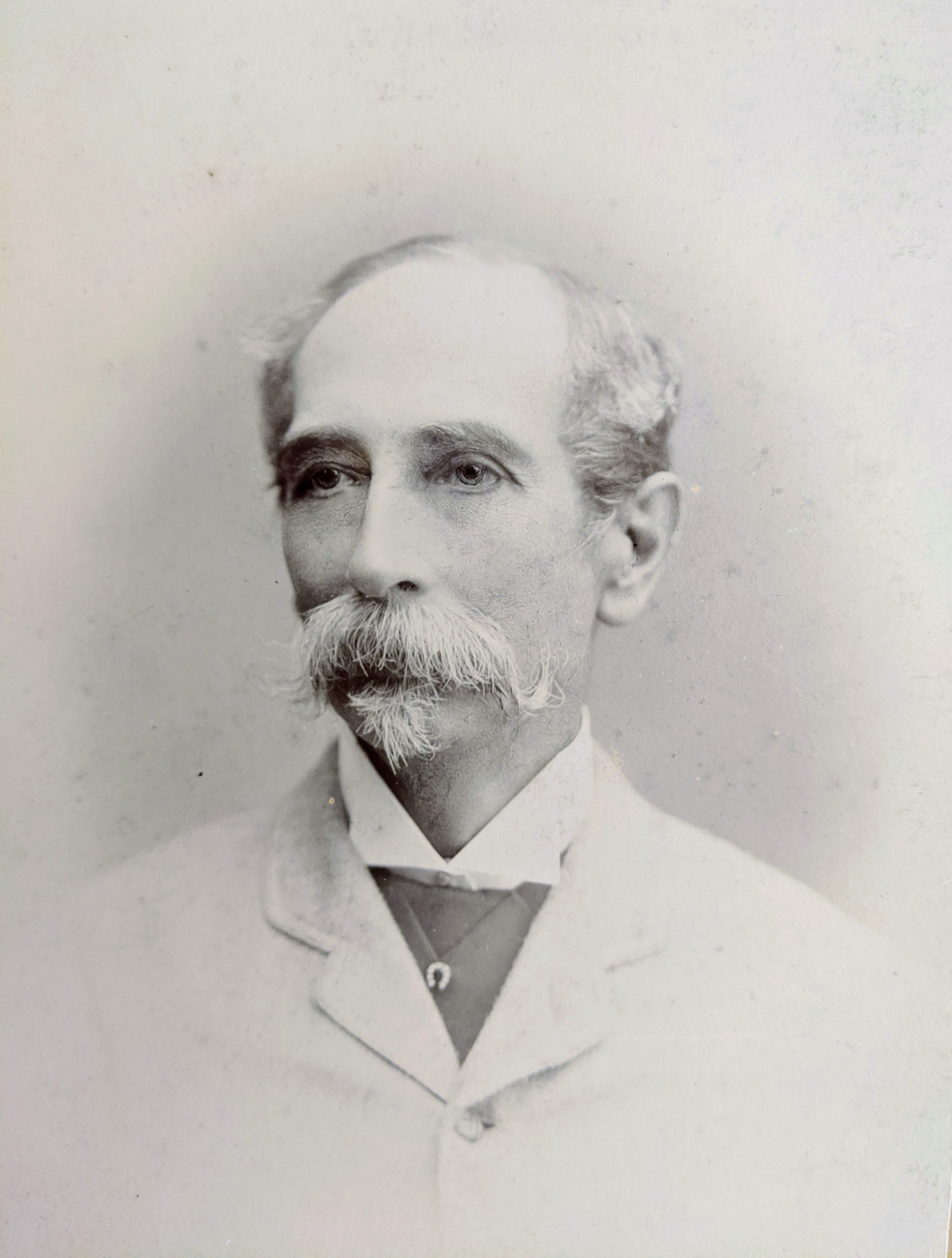
Photo of Charles Ichabod Wright, with inscription on back to Major Cecil Collins dated 1896.

Wright was born at Bramcote, Nottinghamshire the son of the scholar Ichabod Charles Wright and his wife Theodosia Denman. He was educated at Windlesham House School, Eton College and Christ Church, Oxford. His great grandfather founded a bank and Wright became a banker in the firm of I and IC Wright & Co. He also served for many years as a volunteer in Robin Hood Rifles, of which he became lieutenant colonel. He was also a J.P. for Nottinghamshire.

Wright was elected as one of the two Member of Parliament (MPs) for the constituency of Nottingham at the 1868 general election. He resigned from parliament in 1870, due to ill health, by the procedural device of accepting the appointment as Steward of the Chiltern Hundreds.

In 1871 Wright was living at Heathfield Hall, Burwash, Sussex where his father died. Wright owned Watcombe Park between Newton Abbot and Torquay (now known as Brunel Manor) where he and his family were living in 1881. Later he was living at Hartendale Frensham Surrey, where he died at the age of 76. He was buried at the church of St Thomas on the Bourne Farnham.

Wright married Blanche Louise Bingham, eldest daughter of Henry Bingham, in 1852.

Parliament of the United Kingdom
Preceded by Ralph Bernal Osborne; Viscount Amberley	Member of Parliament for Nottingham; 1868–1870; With: Sir Robert Juckes Clifton 1868–1869; Charles Seely 1869–1870	Succeeded by Charles Seely; Hon. Auberon Herbert
