= Robert Juckes Clifton =

English Liberal Party politician (1826-1869)

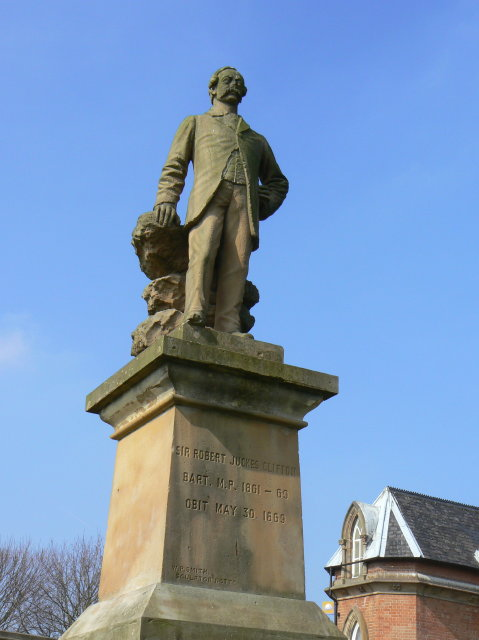
Sir Robert Juckes Clifton, 9th Baronet statue near Wilford Toll Bridge

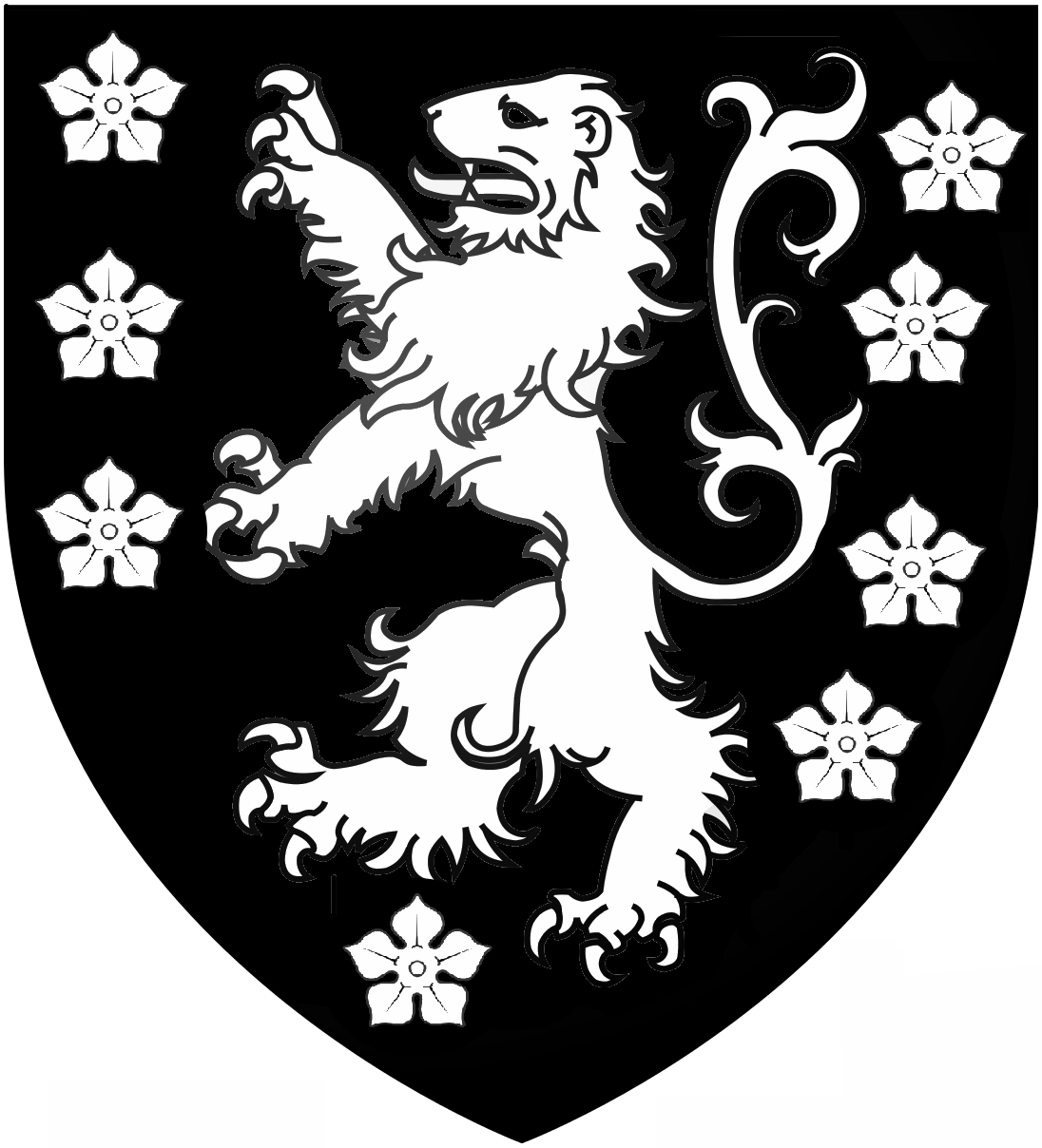
Arms of Clifton of Clifton, Nottinghamshire (Clifton Baronets): Sable semée of cinquefoils and a lion rampant argent

Sir Robert Juckes Clifton, 9th Baronet (24 December 1826 – 30 May 1869) was an English Liberal Party politician who sat in the House of Commons in two periods between 1861 and 1869.

Clifton was the son of Sir Juckes Granville Juckes-Clifton, 8th Baronet and his second wife Marianne Swinfen, daughter of John Swinfen of Swinfen, Staffordshire. He was educated at Eton College and Christ Church, Oxford. He succeeded his father to the baronetcy in 1852, but had to live for several years in France because of his debts from gambling and horse racing (see George Samuel Ford).

In December 1861, Clifton was elected at a by-election as a Member of Parliament (MP) for Nottingham. He was re-elected at the 1865 general election, but his election was declared void on 20 April 1866. He was re-elected for Nottingham at the 1868 general election but died a year later at the age of 42 from typhoid fever.

In 1868 building work began on the Clifton Colliery at Wilford after coal was found on the estate. The colliery opened in 1870 after Clifton's death, as did the Wilford Toll Bridge for which he was also responsible.

Clifton married Geraldine Isabella O'Meara, daughter of Colonel John O'Meara, in 1863. They had no children and the baronetcy became extinct upon his death. The Clifton estates went to his cousin's son Henry Robert Markham.

Parliament of the United Kingdom
Preceded by John Mellor; Charles Paget	Member of Parliament for Nottingham; 1861 – 1866; With: Charles Paget to 1865; Samuel Morley 1865	Succeeded by Ralph Bernal Osborne; Viscount Amberley
Preceded by Ralph Bernal Osborne; Viscount Amberley	Member of Parliament for Nottingham; 1868 – 1869; With: Charles Ichabod Wright	Succeeded by Charles Seely; Charles Ichabod Wright
Baronetage of England
Preceded by Juckes Juckes-Clifton	Baronet (of Clifton, Nottinghamshire); 1852–1869	Extinct
