= Gilbert Millington =

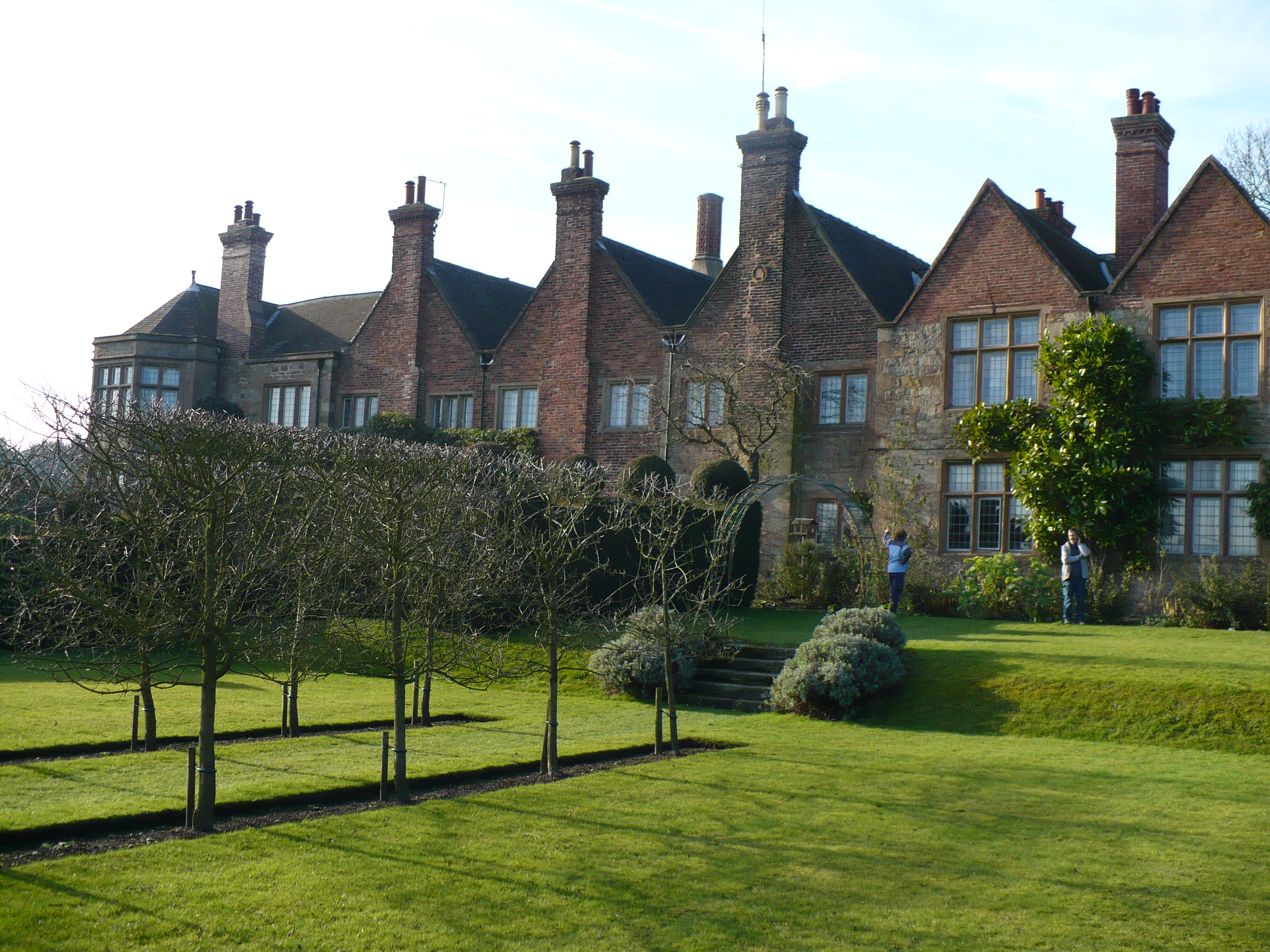
Felley Priory today

Gilbert Millington (c. 1598–1666) was a barrister and one of the Regicides of King Charles I of England.

== Life ==
Millington was probably born at Felley Priory in about 1598. He was the eldest son of Anthony and Prudence Millington and was educated at Peterhouse, Cambridge becoming a member of Lincoln's Inn in 1614 and a barrister there by 1621. He had married in 1618 and inherited his father's estates in 1620. The estate was over 800 acres and enabled Millington to support causes in Nottingham and later in Parliament. He took on various public jobs in Nottingham looking after the sewers and then as Deputy Lieutenant for Nottinghamshire firstly in 1638.

He became the Master of Chancery in 1639 and he was elected as an M.P. for Nottingham, in the Long Parliament of 1640. He was made deputy-lieutenant for Nottinghamshire again in 1642. He was agent of communication between the Governor of Nottingham Castle, Colonel John Hutchinson (1615–1664), and the county committee, who were in dispute over the control of local troops. In 1649 he was one of the few barristers and he was energetic at the trial of Charles I and amongst those who signed the king's death-warrant. After the restoration of the monarchy in 1660 he was condemned to death, but his sentence was later commuted on appeal to life imprisonment. He spent his final days at Mont Orgueil Castle on Jersey where he died on 19 September 1666.
