= Richard Slater =

English politician

Richard Slater (25 November 1634 – 17 August 1699) was an English politician.

He was born the eldest son of Anthony Slater, a grocer of Cheapside, London and Stainsby, Stainton, Yorkshire and entered Lincoln's Inn in 1651.

He was appointed High Sheriff of Nottinghamshire for 1676–77. He was the Member of Parliament (MP) for Nottingham from 1679 to 1685 and again from 1690 to 1699.

He died aged 64. He had married Elizabeth, with whom he had three daughters.

Parliament of England
| Preceded by Arthur Stanhope; Robert Pierrepont | Member of Parliament for Nottingham; 1679–1685; With: Robert Pierrepont 1660–1685 | Succeeded by John Beaumont; Sir William Stanhope |
