= Auberon Herbert =

English writer, individualist philosopher and Liberal MP (1838–1906)

The Honourable Auberon Herbert
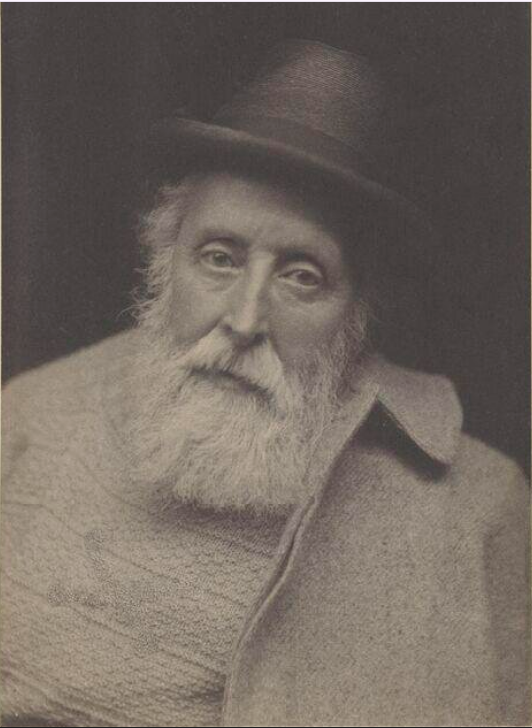
- Herbert, c. 1890s

Member of Parliament for Nottingham
- In office 24 February 1870 – 26 January 1874 Serving with Charles Seely
- Preceded by: Charles Seely and Charles Ichabod Wright
- Succeeded by: William Evelyn Denison and Saul Isaac

Personal details
- Born: Auberon Edward William Molyneux Herbert; 18 June 1838 Highclere Castle, Hampshire, England
- Died: 5 November 1906 (aged 68) Old House, Burley, Hampshire, England
- Party: Liberal
- Spouse: Lady Florence Cowper (m. 1871; died 1886)
- Children: 4, including Auberon Thomas and Nan Ino
- Parent(s): Henry Herbert, 3rd Earl of Carnarvon; Henrietta Anna Howard
- Relatives: Henry Herbert, 4th Earl of Carnarvon (brother)
- Education: St John's College, Oxford
- Known for: Voluntaryism; republicanism; support for women's suffrage; protection of wild birds

Philosophical work
- Era: 19th-century philosophy
- Region: Western philosophy
- School: Classical liberalism
- Notable ideas: Voluntaryism · voluntary taxation

Auberon Edward William Molyneux Herbert (18 June 1838 – 5 November 1906) was an English writer, theorist, individualist philosopher, and politician. A son of the 3rd Earl of Carnarvon, he was a Liberal Member of Parliament for the two-member constituency of Nottingham from 1870 to 1874. He promoted a classical liberal philosophy and took the ideas of Herbert Spencer a stage further by advocating voluntary-funded government that uses force only in defence of individual liberty and private property. He is known as the originator of voluntaryism.

A Radical in his parliamentary years, Herbert declared himself a republican in the House of Commons, voted for women's suffrage, co-sponsored the 1872 Proportional Representation Bill, championed the agricultural labourers' union movement of Joseph Arch, and took a leading part in the passing of the Wild Birds Protection Act 1872. He was the founder of the Savile Club and belonged to the Radical Club of Henry Fawcett.

== Early life and education ==
Herbert was born at Highclere Castle on 18 June 1838. He was the third son of the 3rd Earl of Carnarvon, and brother of Henry Herbert, the 4th Earl. Herbert was educated at Eton College, entering the school in 1850. He left school early, having been elected to a founder's kin fellowship at St John's College, Oxford in 1855. He gained a second class in Classical Moderations in 1857.

In May 1858 he joined the 7th Queen's Own Hussars at Canterbury with the rank of cornet by purchase, and in June 1859 became a lieutenant, also by purchase. In the autumn of 1860 he joined the service troops at Umballa, India. In 1861 he returned to England and sold his commission in 1862. He then resumed his career at Oxford, where he was President of the Union in Hilary Term 1862; he graduated BCL in 1862 and DCL in 1865. He lectured in history and jurisprudence at St John's College, and resigned his fellowship in 1869.

In March 1864 he visited the scene of the Prusso-Danish war, and distinguished himself at Dybbøl by sallies from the Danish redoubts for the purpose of rescuing the wounded. As a recognition of his bravery he was made a knight of the Order of the Dannebrog. His impressions of the campaign were recorded in his letters to his mother published under the title The Danes in Camp (1864). He went to the United States during the American Civil War, and witnessed the Siege of Richmond (1864–65). During the Franco-Prussian War he went to France, and was present at the Battle of Sedan. He was outside Paris during the Siege of Paris, and was one of the first to enter the city after the capitulation, being nearly shot as a spy on his way in. He remained there during the Paris Commune in the company of his second brother, Alan Herbert, who practised medicine in Paris. In later life he received the Austrian Order of the Iron Crown, third class, for helping to rescue the crew of the Pare, an Austrian vessel wrecked off Westward Ho!

== Early political career ==
Herbert stood as a Conservative candidate for Newport in the 1865 general election but was defeated. He held the post of private secretary to Stafford Northcote, the President of the Board of Trade, from 1866 to 1868. His politics moving rapidly leftward, he stood as a Liberal candidate for Berkshire in the 1868 election but lost. He served as President of the fourth day of the first ever Co-operative Congress in 1869.

== Member of Parliament ==
Herbert was elected as a Liberal at a by-election for Nottingham on 24 February 1870. In the debates on the Elementary Education Act 1870 he supported the principle that all provided schools should be secular or strictly unsectarian — a position in contrast to his later opposition to state provision — and he criticised the religious provisions of the Scotch Education Bill of 1872 on similar grounds.

=== Republicanism ===
On 19 March 1872 he seconded Sir Charles Dilke's motion for an inquiry into the expenses of the civil list and, following Dilke's example, declared himself a republican. The declaration provoked a scene of great disorder, and the latter part of his speech was inaudible. Herbert acted as teller with Dilke in the ensuing division, in which the motion was defeated by 276 votes to two.

=== Parliamentary and franchise reform ===
Herbert supported the parliamentary campaign for women's suffrage, voting for the second reading of Jacob Bright's Women's Disabilities Bill on 3 May 1871 and appearing in the ayes for the Women's Disabilities Removal Bill on 1 May 1872, both of which were defeated.

On 28 February 1872 he was one of the sponsors, with Walter Morrison, Thomas Hughes and Henry Fawcett, of a Proportional Representation Bill embodying the scheme of personal representation advocated by John Stuart Mill and Thomas Hare; the bill made no progress.

=== Bird protection ===
Herbert took a leading part in the passing of the Wild Birds Protection Act 1872, which extended the close-season protection introduced for seabirds by the Sea Birds Preservation Act 1869 to some forty inland species. The following session, on 29 April 1873, he moved for and obtained a select committee to consider extending the close season to species omitted from the 1872 Act, and was himself named to the committee; opposing the motion, Clare Sewell Read remarked that the Member for Nottingham "ought to be satisfied with the victory he achieved in this direction last year".

=== Labour and other causes ===
He was an ardent supporter of Joseph Arch and spoke at the mass meeting at Leamington on Good Friday 1872, when the National Agricultural Labourers' Union was formed. In 1873, criticising the army estimates, he questioned the organisation and efficiency of the standing army, arguing that a territorial citizen force on the volunteer model would be both more effective and less costly. In April 1873 he sought leave to bring in a bill to limit the compensation payable on the abolition of college fellowships at Oxford and Cambridge, anticipating the university reforms then under consideration.

On account of his objection to taking life he became a vegetarian. Herbert retired from parliamentary life at the 1874 general election.

== Clubs ==
In 1868 Herbert was among the founding-year members of the club that became the Savile Club, established that year as the Eclectic Club (renamed the New Club in 1869 and the Savile Club in 1871), whose earliest membership was drawn heavily from Liberals and Radicals of his stamp.

He also belonged to the Radical Club, the dining and discussion club founded by Henry Fawcett in 1870 as a support network for the Radical wing of the Liberal Party, in which John Stuart Mill was the dominant early figure, Sir Charles Dilke served as secretary and Millicent Fawcett as treasurer. Its forty members were divided equally between parliamentarians and sympathetic writers and academics, and Herbert's republican declaration of 1872, made in seconding Dilke, carried the club's instincts onto the floor of the Commons.

== Later public life and voluntaryism ==
After leaving Parliament, Herbert took an active part in the agitation caused by the Bulgarian atrocities; organised in 1878 the great "anti-Jingo" demonstration in Hyde Park against the expected war with Russia; and in 1880 championed the cause of Charles Bradlaugh, speaking at some of the stormy Hyde Park meetings. His anti-imperialism extended to opposing British intervention in Egypt in the early 1880s, supporting Irish self-determination, and opposing the Second Boer War.

He was an ardent but independent supporter of Herbert Spencer. His creed developed a variant of Spencerian individualism which he described as "voluntaryism". In 1884 Herbert published his best-known book, A Politician in Trouble about his Soul, a reprint with alterations and additions from The Fortnightly Review. In the first chapters the objections to the party system are discussed, and in the last chapter Spencerian principles are expounded and the doctrine of laissez-faire is pushed to the extreme point of advocating "voluntary taxation". In 1890 Herbert started a small weekly paper, Free Life, which soon became a small separate monthly paper, the Organ of Voluntary Taxation and the Voluntary State, which ran until 1901.

Herbert's interests extended well beyond political theory: alongside poetry and travel writing, his non-political essays took in religion, clean air and forest conservation — concerns of a piece with his parliamentary work on bird protection and reflected in Bad Air and Bad Health (1894) and in the open-air simplicity of his later life in the New Forest.

== Anarchism ==
In an announcement of Herbert's death, Benjamin Tucker said, "Auberon Herbert is dead. He was a true anarchist in everything but name. How much better (and how much rarer) to be an anarchist in everything but name than to be an anarchist in name only!" Tucker praised Herbert's work as "a magnificent assault on the majority idea, a searching exposure of the inherent evil of State systems, and a glorious assertion of the inestimable benefits of voluntary action and free competition..." while admonishing him for his support of profit in trade (but believed, unlike Herbert himself, that Herbert's system would result in an economy without profit). According to Eric Mack, Herbert felt that people who "like Tucker, favored the free establishment of defensive associations and juridical institutions were simply making a verbal error in calling themselves 'anarchists'."

Herbert explicitly rejected the label "anarchist" for his ideas. He argued that anarchy was a "contradiction", and that the Voluntaryists "reject the anarchist creed". They "believe in a national government, voluntary supported... and only entrusted with force for protection of person and property". He called his system of a national government funded by non-coerced contributions "the Voluntary State".

According to Chris Tame, "He refused to accept the label of 'anarchist', largely because of a semantic decision whereby he labelled the defensive use of force (which, naturally, he accepted) as 'government.'" Richard Sylvan points out that "a variety of political arrangements and organization, including governments of certain sorts, are entirely compatible with anarchy." Rather, anarchists oppose the state or "coercive government." Sean Sheehan points out, "A distinction that is relevant to the anarchist ideal is the difference between the government, referring to the state, and government, referring to the administration of a political system. Anarchists, like everyone, tend to use the word government as a synonym for state, but what is rejected by anarchism's a priori opposition to the state is not the concept of government as such but the idea of a sovereign order that claims and demand obedience, and if necessary the lives, of its subjects."

Anarchist William R. McKercher notes that Herbert "was often mistakenly taken as an anarchist" but "a reading of Herbert's work will show that he was not an anarchist." The leading British anarchist journal of the time noted that the "Auberon Herbertites in England are sometimes called Anarchists by outsiders, but they are willing to compromise with the inequity of government to maintain private property." Since the development of anarcho-capitalism in the 1950s, at least one anarcho-capitalist, Hans-Hermann Hoppe, believes that Herbert "develops the Spencerian idea of equal freedom to its logically consistent anarcho-capitalist end" as noted in a bibliography. However, anarcho-capitalist Murray Rothbard disagreed and called Herbert a "near-anarchist." Victor Yarros, an individualist anarchist, noted what he believed to be a key flaw in Herbert's ideology, namely economic inequality. In an article called "Private Property and Freedom", Yarros argued:

[Auberon Herbert] believes in allowing people to retain all their possessions, no matter how unjustly and basely acquired, while getting them, so to speak, to swear off stealing and usurping and to promise to behave well in the future. We, on the other hand, while insisting on the principle of private property, in wealth honestly obtained under the reign of liberty, do not think it either unjust or unwise to dispossess the landlords who have monopolized natural wealth by force and fraud. We hold that the poor and disinherited toilers would be justified in expropriating, not alone the landlords, who notoriously have no equitable titles to their lands, but all the financial lords and rulers, all the millionaires and very wealthy individuals. . . . Almost all possessors of great wealth enjoy neither what they nor their ancestors rightfully acquired (and if Mr. Herbert wishes to challenge the correctness of this statement, we are ready to go with him into a full discussion of the subject). . . . If he holds that the landlords are justly entitled to their lands, let him make a defense of the landlords or an attack on our unjust proposal.

According to Carl Watner, "Herbert never defended his position in Liberty." Anarcho-communist Peter Kropotkin echoed Yarros and argued that the "modern Individualism initiated by Herbert Spencer is... a powerful indictment against the dangers and wrongs of government, but its practical solution of the social problem is miserable – so miserable as to lead us to inquire if the talk of 'No force' be merely an excuse for supporting landlord and capitalist domination." John A. Hobson, an early democratic socialist, echoed the anarchist critique in his essay on Herbert, "A Rich Man's Anarchism". He argued that Herbert's support for exclusive private property would result in the poor being enslaved to the rich. Herbert, "by allowing first comers to monopolise without restriction the best natural supplies" would allow them "to thwart and restrict the similar freedom of those who come after." Hobson gave the "extreme instance" of an island "the whole of which is annexed by a few individuals, who use the rights of exclusive property and transmission... to establish primogeniture." In such a situation, the bulk of the population would be denied the right to exercise their faculties or to enjoy the fruits of their labour, which Herbert claimed to be the inalienable rights of all. Hobson concluded: "It is thus that the 'freedom' of a few (in Herbert's sense) involves the 'slavery' of the many." Hobson's argument reflected Pierre-Joseph Proudhon's critique of inheritance and land laws in continental Europe in What Is Property? Scholar M. W. Taylor says that "of all the points Hobson raised... this argument was his most effective, and Herbert was unable to provide a satisfactory response."

== Personal life ==
In 1871 Herbert married Lady Florence Amabel, daughter of George Cowper, 6th Earl Cowper. She died in 1886. They had four children:

- Rolf (23 July 1872 – 13 April 1882), died in childhood
- Clair Mimram (28 September 1874 – 8 January 1893), died young
- Capt. Auberon Thomas "Bron" (1876–1916), who succeeded his uncle Francis Cowper, 7th Earl Cowper as 9th Baron Lucas and 5th Lord Dingwall in 1905. He flew for the Royal Flying Corps in the First World War and died of wounds after being shot down over France.
- Nan Ino (1880–1958), who succeeded her brother as 10th Baroness Lucas and 6th Lady Dingwall.

On leaving Parliament, he took to farming, purchasing Ashley Arnewood farm in Ashley, New Forest, where he lived until his wife's death in 1886, paying his labourers above the prevailing wage and encouraging them to unionise.

In December 1874, when Mary Anne Girling and her sect of New Forest Shakers were evicted from New Forest Lodge at Hordle in a winter storm, Herbert gave them the use of a barn at Ashley Arnewood for some five weeks — on condition that Girling sign a written undertaking against the naked dancing rumoured of the sect — until the local sanitary authority declared the barn overcrowded in February 1875 and required them to leave. For one week each year he offered free meals to all in the locality, including Gypsies.

He then moved to the neighbourhood of Burley in the New Forest, and built, after a pre-existing building, "The Old House", which was his home until his death on 5 November 1906. He was buried in a grave in the grounds of his house.

== Works ==
Among Herbert's published works are:

- The Danes in Camp: Letters from Sönderborg (1864)
- A Politician in Trouble about his Soul (1884)
- The Right and Wrong of Compulsion by the State (1885)
- A Politician in Sight of Haven: Being a Protest Against the Government of Man by Man (1890)
- Bad Air and Bad Health (1894) – co-authored with Harold Wager
- Windfall and Waterdrift (1894) – a volume of poetry
- The Voluntaryist Creed (1908)

Parliament of the United Kingdom
Preceded by Charles Seely; Charles Ichabod Wright	Member of Parliament for Nottingham; 1870–1874; Served alongside: Charles Seely	Succeeded by William Evelyn Denison; Saul Isaac
