= George Lascelles (MP) =

16th-century English politician

George Lascelles (by 1499 – November 1558), of Sturton and Gateford, Nottinghamshire, was an English politician.

He was a member (MP) of the parliament of England for Nottinghamshire in March 1553.
