= William Bentinck =

William Bentinck may refer to:

- William Bentinck (Royal Navy officer) (1764–1813), Royal Navy officer
- Lord William Bentinck (1774–1839), British soldier and statesman
- William Bentinck, 1st Earl of Portland (1649–1709), Knight of the Garter
- William Bentinck, 2nd Duke of Portland (1709–1762), Knight of the Garter
- William Bentinck, 4th Duke of Portland (1768–1854), British politician
- William Bentinck (priest) (1784–1868), Archdeacon of Westminster
- William Bentinck, Viscount Woodstock (born 1984), British entrepreneur

== See also ==
- William Cavendish-Bentinck (disambiguation)
- William Cavendish-Scott-Bentinck, 5th Duke of Portland (1800–1879), British aristocrat
- Lord William Bentinck, a number of ships with this name
