= Charles Pierrepont =

Charles Pierrepont may refer to:

- Charles Pierrepont, 1st Earl Manvers (1737–1816), British peer
- Charles Pierrepont, 2nd Earl Manvers (1778–1860), British peer
- Charles Pierrepont, 4th Earl Manvers (1854–1926), British peer
- Charles Pierrepont, Viscount Newark (1805–1850), member of parliament for East Retford, and poet
