= Henry Pierrepont =

Henry Pierrepont may refer to:

- Henry Pierrepont (died 1452), MP for Nottinghamshire
- Henry Pierrepont (politician) (1546–1615), MP for Nottinghamshire
- Henry Pierrepont, 1st Marquess of Dorchester (1606–1680), English peer
- Henry Pierrepont (diplomat) (1780–1851), British diplomat

== See also ==
- Henry Pierrepoint (1877–1922), English executioner
