= Thomas Rempston =

- Thomas Rempston (KG)
- Thomas Rempston (died 1458)
