= Nottinghamshire (constituency) =

Parliamentary constituency in the United Kingdom, 1801–1832

- Former county constituency for the House of Commons
- County: Nottinghamshire

1290–1832
- Seats: Two
- Replaced by: North Nottinghamshire and South Nottinghamshire

Nottinghamshire was a county constituency of the House of Commons of the Parliament of England, then of the Parliament of Great Britain from 1707 to 1800 and of the Parliament of the United Kingdom from 1801 to 1832. It was represented by two Members of Parliament (MPs), traditionally known as knights of the shire.

The constituency was split into two two-member divisions, for parliamentary purposes, by the Reform Act 1832. The county was then represented by the North Nottinghamshire and South Nottinghamshire constituencies.

== Boundaries ==
The county of Nottinghamshire is located in the East Midlands of England. The county is known to have been represented in Parliament from 1290, although it probably sent knights of the shire to earlier meetings.

From 1295 the county and the town of Nottingham each returned two members to parliament. In 1572 East Retford was represented by two members, and in 1672 Newark-upon-Trent also. Under the Reform Act 1832 the county returned four members in two divisions. By the Redistribution of Seats Act 1885 it returned four members in four divisions; Newark and East Retford were disfranchised, and Nottingham returned three members in three divisions.

== Members of Parliament ==
=== 1290–1640 ===
1305 Sir Hugh de Hercy and Thomas Malet

1316 Sir Hugh de Hercy and Lawrence Chaworth

Parliament	First member	Second member
1297	Sir John de Vilers	
1307	Sir Walter Goushill of Hoveringham	
1311	Sir Walter Goushill of Hoveringham	
1312	John de Lisours	
1313	Laurencius de Cadurcis	
1318	Sir Richard Willoughby	Peter Foun
1320	John Darcy	
1324	Robert de Jorce	Sir Richard de Willoughby
1361–1393	Robert Morton	
1373	John Gateford	
1376–1390	Sir John Burton (5 times)	
1377–1388	John Annesley	
1378	Sir John Leake	
1378	William Neville	
1379	Sir John Birmingham	
1380 (Nov)	John Gateford	
1381	Sir Thomas Rempston	
1383	Sir Thomas Rempston	
1386	Sir John Annesley	Sir John Leake
1388 (Feb)	Sir John Annesley	Sir John Leake
1388 (Sep)	Sir John Annesley	Sir Robert Cockfield
1390 (Jan)	John Gateford	Sir John Leake
1390 (Nov)	Sir John Burton	Hugh Cressy
1391	Sir Thomas Hercy	Sir Robert Cockfield
1393	Sir Thomas Rempston	John Gateford
1394	Sir William Neville	Nicholas Strelley
1395	Sir Thomas Rempston	Nicholas Burdon
1397 (Jan)	Sir Thomas Rempston	Hugh Cressy
1397 (Sep)	Sir Thomas Rempston	Robert Morton
1399	William Leek	John Gateford
1401	Sir John Burton (son of Sir John, 1376)	John Kniveton
1402	Sir John Clifton	Sir Richard Stanhope
1404 (Jan)	John Leek	Sir Richard Stanhope
1404 (Oct)	Simon Leek	Sir Richard Stanhope
1406	Sir Thomas Chaworth	Sir Richard Stanhope
1407	Sir John Zouche	Sir Hugh Hussey
1410		
1411	William Rigmaiden	Thomas Staunton
1413 (Feb)		
1413 (May)	Sir John Zouche	Sir Thomas Rempston II
1413 (Apr)	Sir Robert Plumpton	Henry Sutton
1414 (Nov)	Ralph Mackerell	Sir Hugh Hussey
1415		
1416 (Mar)	William Compton	Sir Thomas Rempston II
1416 (Oct)		
1417	Sir Thomas Chaworth	Sir Henry Pierrepont
1419	Sir John Zouche	Ralph Hussey
1420	Sir Thomas Chaworth	Ralph Mackerell
1421 (May)	Sir Thomas Chaworth	Sir William Mering
1421 (Dec)	Sir Henry Pierrepont	Sir Richard Stanhope
1422	Sir John Zouche	
1423	Sir Henry Pierrepont	Sir Thomas Chaworth
1425	Sir Henry Pierrepont	Sir William Mering
1427	Ralph Mackerell	
1429	John Bowes	
1432	John Bowes	
1435	John Bowes	
1436	William Plumpton	
1437	Sir Thomas Chaworth	
1439	John Bowes	
1442	Sir William Mering	Sir John Zouche
1445	Sir Thomas Chaworth	
1510–1523	No names known	
1529	Sir John Markham	Sir John Byron
1536		
1539	Gervase Clifton	John Hercy
1542		
1545	Sir Anthony Neville	Michael Stanhope
1547	Sir Michael Stanhope	Sir John Markham
1553 (Mar)	William Mering	George Lascelles
1553 (Oct)	Sir John Hercy	Sir William Holles
1554 (Apr)	Sir John Constable	Ellis Markham
1554 (Nov)	Richard Whalley	Ellis Markham
1555	Richard Whalley	Anthony Forster
1558	Sir John Markham	Hugh Thornhill
1559 (Jan)(writ)	Sir John Markham	John Manners
1562–1563	John Manners	John Molyneux
1571	Robert Markham	Edward Stanhope
1572	Henry Pierrepont	Edward Stanhope
1584 (Nov)	Sir Thomas Manners	Sir Robert Constable
1586	Sir Thomas Manners	Sir Thomas Stanhope
1588 (Oct)	Robert Markham	Brian Lascelles
1593 (Jan)	Sir Charles Cavendish	Philip Strelley
1597 (Oct)	John Byron	Richard Whalley
1601 (Oct)	Sir Charles Cavendish	Robert Pierrepont
1604–1611	Sir John Holles	Percival Willoughby
Addled Parliament (1614)	Sir John Holles	Sir Gervase Clifton
1621–1622	George Chaworth, 1st Viscount Chaworth	Sir Gervase Clifton
Happy Parliament (1624)	Robert Sutton	Sir Gervase Clifton
Useless Parliament (1625)	Sir Henry Stanhope	Sir Gervase Clifton
1626	Sir Henry Stanhope	Sir Thomas Hutchinson
1628	Sir John Byron	Sir Gervase Clifton
No Parliament summoned 1629–1640

=== 1640–1832 ===
Year	First member	First party	Second member	Second party
April 1640	Sir Thomas Hutchinson	Parliamentarian	Robert Sutton	Royalist
November 1640	Sir Thomas Hutchinson	Parliamentarian	Robert Sutton	Royalist
August 1643	Hutchinson died – seat vacant		Robert Sutton	Royalist
December 1643	Hutchinson died – seat vacant		Sutton disabled to sit – seat vacant	
1645	John Hutchinson		Gervase Pigot	
1653	John Oddingsels		Edward Cludd	
1654	Representation increased to four members in First and Second Parliaments of the Protectorate			
1654	Hon. William Pierrepont, Major-General Edward Whalley, Colonel Edward Neville, Charles White			
1656	Edward Cludd, Major-General Edward Whalley, Colonel Edward Neville, Peniston Whalley			
1659	Representation reverted to two members in Third Parliaments of the Protectorate			
January 1659	Colonel Edward Neville		Martin Bristow	
May 1659	Colonel John Hutchinson		One seat vacant	
March 1660	Lord Houghton		Hon. William Pierrepont	
1661	Anthony Eyre		Sir Gervase Clifton	
1666	Anthony Eyre		Sir Francis Leke	
1673	Sir Scrope Howe		Sir Francis Leke	
1679	Sir Scrope Howe		John White	
1685	Sir William Clifton, 3rd Baronet		Reason Mellish	
January 1689	Sir Scrope Howe		Lord Houghton	
May 1689	Sir Scrope Howe		John White	
1690	Sir Scrope Howe		William Sacheverell	
1691	Sir Scrope Howe		John White	
1698	Sir Thomas Willoughby		Gervase Eyre	
1701	Sir Thomas Willoughby		Sir Francis Molyneux	
1702	Gervase Eyre		Sir Francis Molyneux	
1704	John Thornhagh		Sir Francis Molyneux	
1705	John Thornhagh		Sir Thomas Willoughby	
1710	The Viscount Howe		William Levinz	Tory
1713	Hon. Francis Willoughby	Tory	William Levinz	Tory
1722	The Viscount Howe	Whig	Sir Robert Sutton	Whig
1732	William Levinz	Tory	Thomas Bennett	Non Partisan
1734	William Levinz (junior)	Non Partisan	Thomas Bennett	Non Partisan
1739	William Levinz (junior)	Non Partisan	Hon. John Mordaunt	Non Partisan
1747	Colonel Lord Robert Sutton (Lord Robert Manners-Sutton)	Non Partisan	John Thornhagh (John Hewett)	Non Partisan
1762	Hon. Thomas Willoughby	Non Partisan	John Thornhagh (John Hewett)	Non Partisan
1774	Hon. Thomas Willoughby	Non Partisan	Earl of Lincoln	Non Partisan
1775	Lord Edward Bentinck	Non Partisan	Earl of Lincoln	Non Partisan
1778	Lord Edward Bentinck	Non Partisan	Charles Medows (Charles Pierrepont)	Non Partisan
1796	Lord William Bentinck	Whig	Hon. Evelyn Pierrepont	Non Partisan
1801	Lord William Bentinck	Whig	Hon. Charles Pierrepont (Viscount Newark)	Non Partisan
1803	Anthony Hardolph Eyre	Non Partisan	Hon. Charles Pierrepont (Viscount Newark)	Non Partisan
1812	Lord William Bentinck	Whig	Hon. Charles Pierrepont (Viscount Newark)	Non Partisan
1814	Frank Frank (Frank Sotheron)	Tory	Hon. Charles Pierrepont (Viscount Newark)	Non Partisan
1816	Frank Frank (Frank Sotheron)	Tory	Lord William Bentinck	Whig
1826	Frank Frank (Frank Sotheron)	Tory	John Lumley	Whig
1831	Evelyn Denison	Whig	John Lumley	Whig
1832	Constituency abolished: see Northern Nottinghamshire, Southern Nottinghamshire			

=== Notes ===
The use of the term 'Non Partisan' in the list does not necessarily mean that the MP was not associated with a particular party or faction in Parliament. Stooks Smith only gives Nottinghamshire candidates party labels for the contested 1722 election and not again until well into the 19th century.

== Election notes ==
The county franchise, from 1430, was held by the adult male owners of freehold land valued at 40 shillings or more. Each elector had as many votes as there were seats to be filled. Votes had to be cast by a spoken declaration, in public, at the hustings, which took place in Nottingham. The expense and difficulty of voting at only one location in the county, together with the lack of a secret ballot contributed to the corruption and intimidation of electors, which was widespread in the unreformed British political system.

The expense, to candidates and their supporters, of contested elections encouraged the leading families of the county to agree on the candidates to be returned unopposed whenever possible. Contested county elections were therefore unusual. Three families; the Duke of Newcastle, the Duke of Portland and the Pierreponts, all Whigs, dominated the county until well into the 19th century, which was why there was no contest after 1722.

The bloc vote electoral system was used in two seat elections and first past the post for single member by-elections. Each voter had up to as many votes as there were seats to be filled. Votes had to be cast by a spoken declaration, in public, at the hustings.

Note on percentage change calculations: Where there was only one candidate of a party in successive elections, for the same number of seats, change is calculated on the party percentage vote. Where there was more than one candidate, in one or both successive elections for the same number of seats, then change is calculated on the individual percentage vote.

Note on sources: The information for the election results given below is taken from Stooks Smith 1715–1754, Namier and Brooke 1754–1790 and Stooks Smith 1790–1832.

== Election results 1715–1832 ==
1710s –

1720s – 1730s – 1740s – 1750s – 1760s – 1770s – 1780s – 1790s – 1790s – 1800s – 1810s – 1820s – 1830s

=== Elections in the 1710s ===
General election 1715: Nottinghamshire (2 seats)
Party	Candidate	Votes	%	±%
Nonpartisan	Francis Willoughby	Unopposed	N/A	N/A
Nonpartisan	William Levinz	Unopposed	N/A	N/A

=== Elections in the 1720s ===
General election 1722: Nottinghamshire (2 seats)
Party	Candidate	Votes	%	±%
Whig	Robert Sutton	1,349	25.89	N/A
Whig	Emanuel Howe	1,339	25.70	N/A
Tory	William Levinz	1,265	24.28	N/A
Tory	Francis Willoughby	1,257	24.13	N/A

- Howe was a Peer of Ireland

General election 1727: Nottinghamshire (2 seats)
Party	Candidate	Votes	%	±%
Nonpartisan	Robert Sutton	Unopposed	N/A	N/A
Nonpartisan	Emanuel Howe	Unopposed	N/A	N/A

=== Elections in the 1730s ===
- Seats vacated on Howe being appointed Governor of Barbados and Sutton being expelled from the House.

By-Election May 1732: Nottinghamshire (2 seats)
Party	Candidate	Votes	%	±%
Nonpartisan	William Levinz	Unopposed	N/A	N/A
Nonpartisan	Thomas Bennet	Unopposed	N/A	N/A
Nonpartisan hold		Swing	N/A	

General election 1734: Nottinghamshire (2 seats)
Party	Candidate	Votes	%	±%
Nonpartisan	William Levinz (junior)	Unopposed	N/A	N/A
Nonpartisan	Thomas Bennet	Unopposed	N/A	N/A

- Death of Bennet

By-Election February 1739: Nottinghamshire
Party	Candidate	Votes	%	±%
Nonpartisan	John Mordaunt	Unopposed	N/A	N/A
Nonpartisan hold		Swing	N/A	

=== Elections in the 1740s ===
General election 1741: Nottinghamshire (2 seats)
Party	Candidate	Votes	%	±%
Nonpartisan	William Levinz (junior)	Unopposed	N/A	N/A
Nonpartisan	John Mordaunt	Unopposed	N/A	N/A

General election 1747: Nottinghamshire (2 seats)
Party	Candidate	Votes	%	±%
Nonpartisan	Robert Manners-Sutton	Unopposed	N/A	N/A
Nonpartisan	John Thornhagh	Unopposed	N/A	N/A

- Sutton adopted the new surname of Manners-Sutton

=== Elections in the 1750s ===
General election 1 May 1754: Nottinghamshire (2 seats)
Party	Candidate	Votes	%	±%
Nonpartisan	Robert Manners-Sutton	Unopposed	N/A	N/A
Nonpartisan	John Thornhagh	Unopposed	N/A	N/A

- John Thornhagh adopted the new surname of Hewett

=== Elections in the 1760s ===
General election 8 April 1761: Nottinghamshire (2 seats)
Party	Candidate	Votes	%	±%
Nonpartisan	Robert Manners-Sutton	Unopposed	N/A	N/A
Nonpartisan	John Hewett	Unopposed	N/A	N/A

- Death of Manners-Sutton

By-Election 13 December 1762: Nottinghamshire
Party	Candidate	Votes	%	±%
Nonpartisan	Thomas Willoughby	Unopposed	N/A	N/A
Nonpartisan hold		Swing	N/A	

General election 28 March 1768: Nottinghamshire (2 seats)
Party	Candidate	Votes	%	±%
Nonpartisan	Thomas Willoughby	Unopposed	N/A	N/A
Nonpartisan	John Hewett	Unopposed	N/A	N/A

=== Elections in the 1770s ===
General election 19 October 1774: Nottinghamshire (2 seats)
Party	Candidate	Votes	%	±%
Nonpartisan	Henry Pelham-Clifton	Unopposed	N/A	N/A
Nonpartisan	Thomas Willoughby	Unopposed	N/A	N/A

- Succession of Willoughby as the 4th Baron Middleton

By-Election 11 January 1775: Nottinghamshire
Party	Candidate	Votes	%	±%
Nonpartisan	Edward Bentinck	Unopposed	N/A	N/A
Nonpartisan hold		Swing	N/A	

- Death of Lincoln

By-Election 9 December 1778: Nottinghamshire
Party	Candidate	Votes	%	±%
Nonpartisan	Charles Medows	Unopposed	N/A	N/A
Nonpartisan hold		Swing	N/A	

=== Elections in the 1780s ===
General election 13 September 1780: Nottinghamshire (2 seats)
Party	Candidate	Votes	%	±%
Nonpartisan	Edward Bentinck	Unopposed	N/A	N/A
Nonpartisan	Charles Medows	Unopposed	N/A	N/A

General election 21 April 1784: Nottinghamshire (2 seats)
Party	Candidate	Votes	%	±%
Nonpartisan	Edward Bentinck	Unopposed	N/A	N/A
Nonpartisan	Charles Medows	Unopposed	N/A	N/A

- Charles Medows adopted the surname of Pierrepont in 1788

=== Elections in the 1790s ===
General election 1790: Nottinghamshire (2 seats)
Party	Candidate	Votes	%	±%
Nonpartisan	Edward Bentinck	Unopposed	N/A	N/A
Nonpartisan	Charles Pierrepont	Unopposed	N/A	N/A

General election 1796: Nottinghamshire (2 seats)
Party	Candidate	Votes	%	±%
Nonpartisan	William Bentinck	Unopposed	N/A	N/A
Nonpartisan	Evelyn Pierrepont	Unopposed	N/A	N/A

- Note (1796): Stooks Smith incorrectly has Lord Edward Bentinck returned at this election rather than Lord William Bentinck

=== Elections in the 1800s ===
- Death of Pierrepont

By-Election November 1801: Nottinghamshire
Party	Candidate	Votes	%	±%
Nonpartisan	Charles Pierrepont	Unopposed	N/A	N/A
Nonpartisan hold				

General election 1802: Nottinghamshire (2 seats)
Party	Candidate	Votes	%	±%
Nonpartisan	Lord William Bentinck	Unopposed	N/A	N/A
Nonpartisan	Charles Pierrepont	Unopposed	N/A	N/A

- Resignation of Bentinck

By-Election April 1803: Nottinghamshire
Party	Candidate	Votes	%	±%
Nonpartisan	Anthony Eyre (MP)	Unopposed	N/A	N/A
Nonpartisan hold				

- Pierrepont became known by the courtesy title of Viscount Newark, when his father was advanced in the peerage by being created Earl Manvers in 1806.

General election 1806: Nottinghamshire (2 seats)
Party	Candidate	Votes	%	±%
Nonpartisan	Viscount Newark	Unopposed	N/A	N/A
Nonpartisan	Anthony Eyre (MP)	Unopposed	N/A	N/A

General election 1807: Nottinghamshire (2 seats)
Party	Candidate	Votes	%	±%
Nonpartisan	Viscount Newark	Unopposed	N/A	N/A
Nonpartisan	Anthony Eyre (MP)	Unopposed	N/A	N/A

=== Elections in the 1810s ===
General election 1812: Nottinghamshire (2 seats)
Party	Candidate	Votes	%	±%
Nonpartisan	Viscount Newark	Unopposed	N/A	N/A
Nonpartisan	Lord William Bentinck	Unopposed	N/A	N/A

- Resignation of Bentinck

By-Election April 1814: Nottinghamshire
Party	Candidate	Votes	%	±%
Tory	Frank Sotheron	Unopposed	N/A	N/A
Tory gain from Nonpartisan				

- Succession of Newark as 2nd Earl Manvers

By-Election June 1816: Nottinghamshire
Party	Candidate	Votes	%	±%
Nonpartisan	Lord William Bentinck	Unopposed	N/A	N/A
Nonpartisan hold				

General election 1818: Nottinghamshire (2 seats)
Party	Candidate	Votes	%	±%
Tory	Frank Sotheron	Unopposed	N/A	N/A
Nonpartisan	Lord William Bentinck	Unopposed	N/A	N/A

- Frank adopted the new surname of Sotheron

=== Elections in the 1820s ===
General election 1818: Nottinghamshire (2 seats)
Party	Candidate	Votes	%	±%
Tory	Frank Sotheron	Unopposed	N/A	N/A
Nonpartisan	Lord William Bentinck	Unopposed	N/A	N/A

General election 1826: Nottinghamshire (2 seats)
Party	Candidate	Votes	%	±%
Tory	Frank Sotheron	Unopposed	N/A	N/A
Whig	John Saville Lumley	Unopposed	N/A	N/A

=== Elections in the 1830s ===
General election 1830: Nottinghamshire (2 seats)
Party	Candidate	Votes	%	±%
Tory	Frank Sotheron	Unopposed	N/A	N/A
Whig	John Saville Lumley	Unopposed	N/A	N/A

General election 1831: Nottinghamshire (2 seats)
Party	Candidate	Votes	%	±%
Whig	John Saville Lumley	Unopposed	N/A	N/A
Whig	Evelyn Denison	Unopposed	N/A	N/A

- Constituency divided in (1832)

== See also ==
- List of former United Kingdom Parliament constituencies
- Unreformed House of Commons
