= Lord Edward Bentinck =

British politician (1744-1819)

Lord Edward Charles Cavendish-Bentinck

Member of Parliament for Lewes
- In office 1766–1768 Serving with William Plumer
- Preceded by: Thomas Sergison; William Plumer
- Succeeded by: Thomas Hampden; Thomas Hay

Member of Parliament for Carlisle
- In office 1768–1774 Serving with George Musgrave
- Preceded by: Raby Vane; Henry Curwen
- Succeeded by: Anthony Storer; Fletcher Norton

Member of Parliament for Nottinghamshire
- In office 1774–1796 Serving with Earl of Lincoln (1774–1775); Charles Medows (1775–1796)
- Preceded by: Hon. Thomas Willoughby; Earl of Lincoln
- Succeeded by: Lord William Bentinck; Hon. Evelyn Pierrepont

Member of Parliament for Clitheroe
- In office 1796–1800 Serving with Hon. Robert Curzon
- Preceded by: Sir John Aubrey, Bt; Richard Erle-Drax-Grosvenor
- Succeeded by: Parliament of the United Kingdom

Member of Parliament for Clitheroe
- In office 1801–1802 Serving with Hon. Robert Curzon
- Preceded by: Parliament of Great Britain
- Succeeded by: Hon. Robert Curzon; Hon. John Cust

Personal details
- Born: 3 March 1744
- Died: 8 October 1819 (aged 75)
- Spouse: Elizabeth Cumberland (m. 1782)
- Children: 4
- Parents: William Bentinck, 2nd Duke of Portland (father); Lady Margaret Cavendish Harley (mother)
- Relatives: Edward Harley, 2nd Earl of Oxford (maternal grandfather); William Cavendish-Bentinck, 3rd Duke of Portland (brother); William Bentinck (son)
- Education: Westminster School, London
- Alma mater: Christ Church, Oxford

Lord Edward Charles Cavendish-Bentinck (3 March 1744 – 8 October 1819), known as Lord Edward Bentinck, was a British politician who sat in the House of Commons from 1766 to 1802.

== Background and education ==
Bentinck was the second son of William Bentinck, 2nd Duke of Portland, by Lady Margaret Cavendish Harley, daughter of Edward Harley, 2nd Earl of Oxford. He was the only brother of Prime Minister William Cavendish-Bentinck, 3rd Duke of Portland. He was educated at Westminster and Christ Church, Oxford, and went on a Grand Tour between 1764 and 1766.

== Political career ==
Bentinck sat as Member of Parliament for Lewes between 1766 and 1768, for Carlisle between 1768 and 1774, for Nottinghamshire between 1774 and 1796 and for Clitheroe between 1796 and 1802. The Clitheroe seat was reportedly to be purchased by the Duke of Portland from the Lister family for £4,000. However, the money could not be found and Thomas Lister was granted a peerage on Portland's recommendation as compensation. Despite his long parliamentary career Bentinck never held ministerial office.

== Family ==
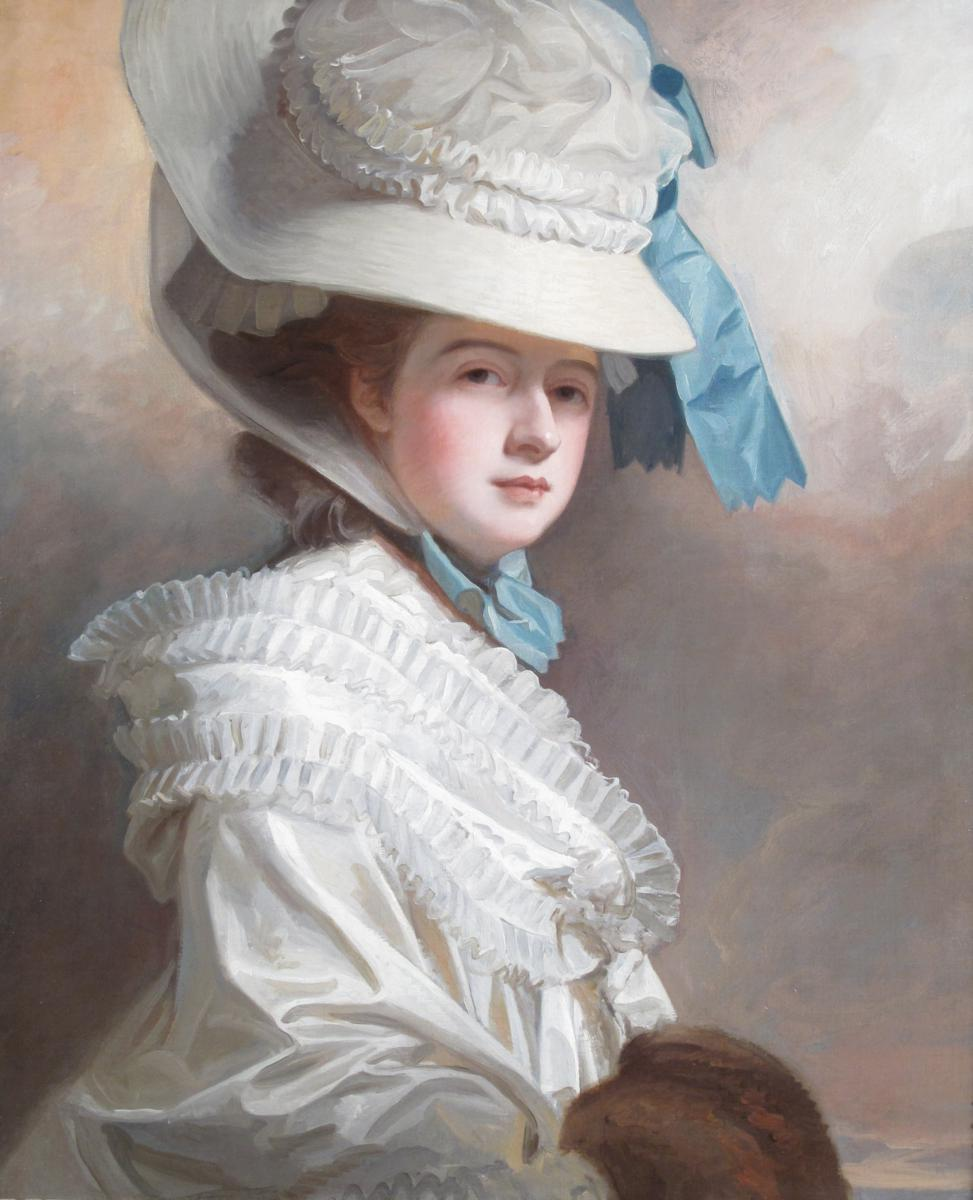
Lady Edward Bentinck née Elizabeth Cumberland, painting by George Romney, c.1779.

Bentinck married Elizabeth, daughter of the dramatist Richard Cumberland, on 28 December 1782. They had two sons and two daughters:

- Ven. William Harry Edward Bentinck (1784–1868), Archdeacon of Westminster
- Cavendish Charles Bentinck (1785–1809)
- Harriet Elizabeth Bentinck (died 1862), married 1809 Sir William Mordaunt Sturt Milner Bt
- Charlotte Georgina Sophia Bentinck (1789–1819), married 1814 Lt. Gen. Sir Robert Garrett KCB

He was said to have been rescued from financial difficulties by his elder brother, but spent the last years of his life in Brussels, apparently due to financial constraints. He died in October 1819, aged 75. Lady Edward Bentinck died in 1837.

Parliament of Great Britain
Preceded by Thomas Sergison; William Plumer	Member of Parliament for Lewes; 1766–1768; With: William Plumer	Succeeded by Thomas Hampden; Thomas Hay
Preceded by Raby Vane; Henry Curwen	Member of Parliament for Carlisle; 1768–1774; With: George Musgrave	Succeeded by Anthony Storer; Fletcher Norton
Preceded by Hon. Thomas Willoughby; Earl of Lincoln	Member of Parliament for Nottinghamshire; 1774–1796; With: Earl of Lincoln 1774–1775; Charles Medows 1775–1796	Succeeded by Lord William Bentinck; Hon. Evelyn Pierrepont
Preceded by Sir John Aubrey, Bt; Richard Erle-Drax-Grosvenor	Member of Parliament for Clitheroe; 1796–1800; With: Hon. Robert Curzon	Succeeded by Parliament of the United Kingdom
Parliament of the United Kingdom
Preceded by Parliament of Great Britain	Member of Parliament for Clitheroe; 1801–1802; With: Hon. Robert Curzon	Succeeded by Hon. Robert Curzon; Hon. John Cust
