= Henry Pierrepont (diplomat) =

English diplomat

Henry Manvers Pierrepont (18 March 1780 – 10 November 1851) was an English diplomat. He served as Envoy to the Court of Sweden from 1804 to 1807.

== Background ==
Pierrepont was the third son of Charles Pierrepont, 1st Earl Manvers, by Anne, daughter of William Mills, of Richmond, Surrey. Evelyn Pierrepont and Charles Pierrepont, 2nd Earl Manvers, were his elder brothers.

== Diplomatic career ==
Pierrepont was Envoy to the Court of Sweden from 1804 to 1807. He was sworn of the Privy Council in 1807.

== Family ==
Pierrepont married Lady Sophia Cecil, daughter of Henry Cecil, 1st Marquess of Exeter, in 1818. They lived at Conholt Park, Wiltshire. Their daughter Augusta Sophia Anne Pierrepont married Major-General Lord Charles Wellesley. Through her, Pierrepont is the maternal grandfather of Henry Wellesley, 3rd Duke of Wellington and Arthur Wellesley, 4th Duke of Wellington. Lady Sophia died in 1823. Pierrepont died in November 1851, aged 71. His memorial is in St. Edmund's Church, Holme Pierrepont.

Diplomatic posts
Preceded by Charles Arbuthnot	Envoy to the Court of Sweden; 1804–1807	Succeeded by Edward Thornton
