= John White (1634–1713) =

English politician and Member of Parliament for Nottinghamshire

John White (1634–1713) was an English politician.

He was the only son of Thomas White of Tuxford, Nottinghamshire and was educated at Emmanuel College, Cambridge and Gray's Inn.

He was Member of Parliament for Nottinghamshire in 1679–1685, from May 1689 to 1690 and then finally from 1691 until 1698. He served on a number of committees.

He married Jane, the daughter of Sir Thomas Williamson, 1st Baronet of East Markham, Nottinghamshire. They had two sons.
