= John Zouche (died 1445) =

English politician (died 1445)

Sir John Zouche (died 1445) was an English politician who sat as MP for Nottinghamshire in 1407, May 1413, 1419, 1422 and 1442. He married Margaret DeBergh.

== Family and education ==
He was the second son of William Zouche, 3rd Lord Zouche and his first wife Agnes (died by 1393), the daughter of Sir Henry Green. By November 1399, he married Margaret (died 23 May 1451), the daughter of Sir John Burgh and widow of Sir John Lowdham. Through this marriage, he acquired interests in Lowdham and Bilsthorpe, WInterton and Marton and Walton. They had one daughter.

Following the death of his uncle, Thomas Zouche he inherited the manor of King's Worthy.

== Political career ==
Circa. 1400 till 1402, he became involved in several property disputes in Nottinghamshire which helped establish his position among the local gentry. In 1407, he was first elected to Parliament for Nottinghamshire. Between August and September 1411, he became involved in a violent land dispute between Alexander Meryng and John Tuxford. He was imprisoned at the Tower of London and released after a month.

In January 1412, he was appointed commissioner of inquiry into tax liabilities in Nottinghamshire. He returned to Parliament in the first Parliament of Henry V in May 1413. In July 1413, he served as commissioner to make arrests in Nottinghamshire. In January 1414, he was appointed commissioner to investigate and arrest Lollards in Nottinghamshire and Derbyshire. In May 1415, he was appointed commissioner of array for Derbyshire during preparations for war with France.

In 1419, he sat in Parliament for Nottinghamshire. In November 1419, he served as commissioner to raise royal loans. In January 1420, he was appointed collector of royal loans in Nottinghamshire. In March 1422, he was again commissioned to raise royal loans. In 1423, he acted as security for William Lovell, 7th Baron Lovell, owed £266 13s. 4d. to Henry Bowet at his death and attended Nottinghamshire parliamentary elections.

From 15 January till 12 December 1426, he served as Sheriff of Nottinghamshire and Derbyshire. In July 1426, he served as commissioner to raise royal loans. In March 1427, he served as commissioner of array for Nottinghamshire. In March 1428, March 1430 and March 1431, he served as commissioner to raise royal loans.

In October 1433, he drew up his first will. In Spring 1434, he sat on a grand jury investigating the maiming of Henry Pierrepont, 1st Marquess of Dorchester and murder of his companions by Thomas Foljambe the Younger. From January till February 1436, he served as tax assessor, commissioner to raise royal loans and he asked personally to lend 100 marks to the Crown. In March 1439, he served as commissioner to raise royal loans. In February 1441, he served as commissioner to negotiate a payment of a subsidy and commissioner to raise royal loans.

In March 1442, he served as commissioner to distribute a tax rebate.

== Later life and death ==
He drew up his final will on 9 September 1445, died in late 1445 and was buried in Southwell Minster. On 23 May 1451, his wife Margaret Zouche died and their estates were divided between their two grandaugthers. She was buried beside him and endowed a chantry at Southwell.
