= Henry Pelham-Clinton, Earl of Lincoln =

British politician

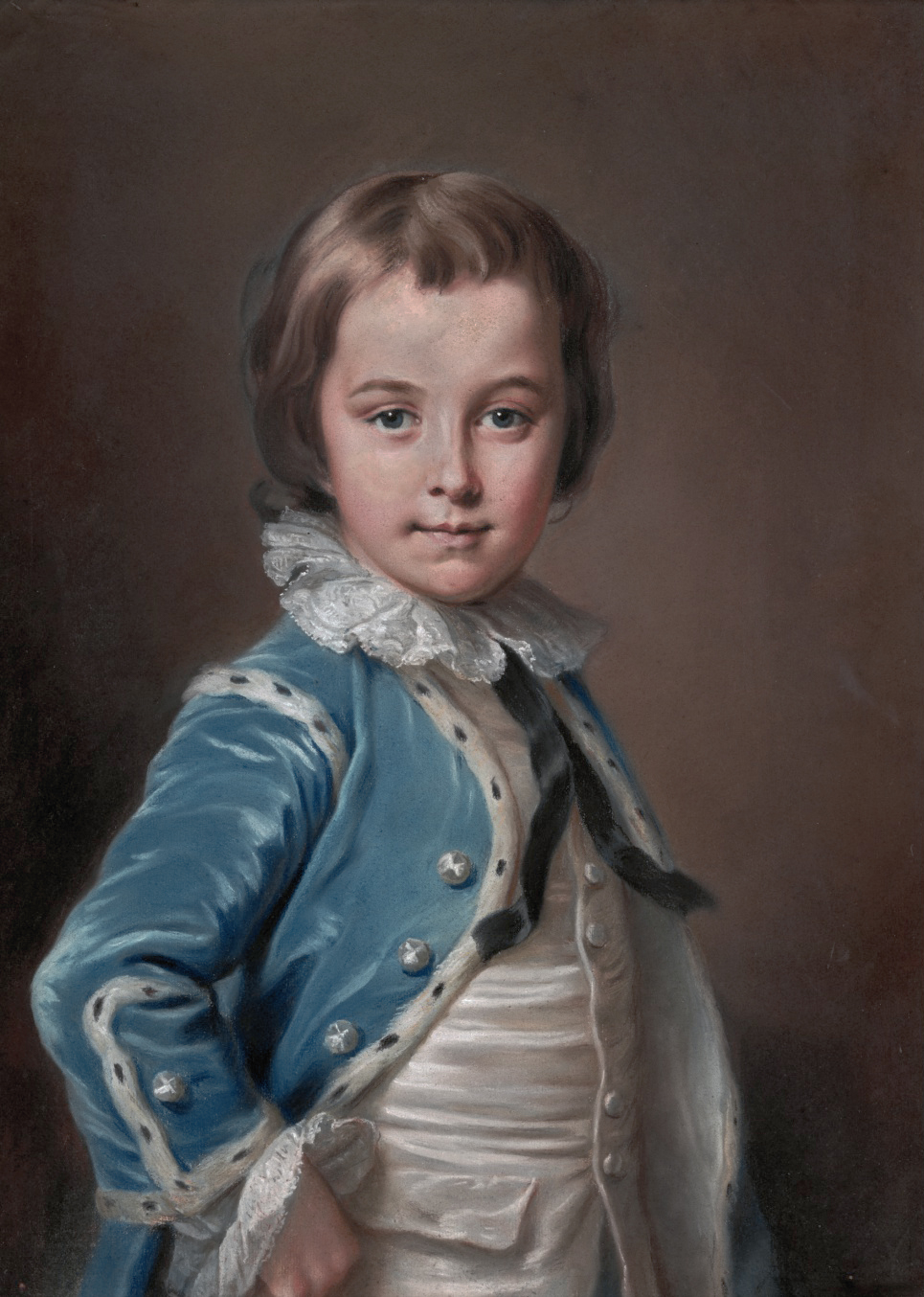
A portrait of a young Pelham-Clinton by William Hoare

Henry Fiennes Pelham-Clinton, Earl of Lincoln (5 November 1750 – 18 October 1778) was a British politician who sat in the House of Commons of Great Britain from 1772 to 1778, representing the constituencies of Aldborough and Nottinghamshire.

Lincoln was the second son of the 2nd Duke of Newcastle-under-Lyne and became heir to his father on the death of his elder brother in 1752. On his Grand Tour to Italy he lost gambling in December 1771 in Florence 12.000 Pounds Sterling to the Zannowich-Brothers. He was educated at Eton and was elected as Tory MP for Aldborough in 1772 and for Nottinghamshire in 1774.

He inherited his family home at 22 Arlington Street in St. James's, a district of the City of Westminster in central London, in 1774 and lived there until his death.

On 21 May 1775, he married Frances Seymour-Conway (4 December 1751 – 11 November 1820), a daughter of the 1st Marquess of Hertford. They had two children:

- Lady Catherine Pelham-Clinton (6 April 1776 – 18 May 1804), who married the 3rd Earl of Radnor on 2 October 1800 and had issue.
- Henry Pelham-Clinton, Earl of Lincoln (23 December 1777 – 23 September 1779)

His father the duke, as Lord Lieutenant of Nottinghamshire, appointed him Lieutenant-Colonel of the Nottinghamshire Militia when it was reformed in 1775.

Pelham-Clinton died before his father at the age of 28, followed soon afterwards by his only son. The dukedom therefore was to pass to his younger brother Thomas on the eventual death of his father in 1794.

Parliament of Great Britain
Preceded by Andrew Wilkinson; Aubrey Beauclerk	Member of Parliament for Aldborough; 1772–1774; With: Aubrey Beauclerk	Succeeded by Abel Smith; Charles Wilkinson
Preceded by John Thornhagh; Thomas Willoughby	Member of Parliament for Nottinghamshire; 1774–1778; With: Thomas Willoughby 1774; Lord Edward Bentinck 1775–1796	Succeeded by Charles Pierrepont; Lord Edward Bentinck
