= Battle of Saint-James =

1426 battle during the Hundred Years' War

- Part of Hundred Years' War
Date	27 February – 6 March 1426
Location	Saint-James, Avranches, Normandy 48°31′22″N 1°19′29″W
Result	English victory

Belligerents
Duchy of Brittany; Kingdom of France	Kingdom of England

Commanders and leaders
Arthur de Richemont	Sir Thomas Rempston

Strength
16,000	600

Casualties and losses
650	None or negligible
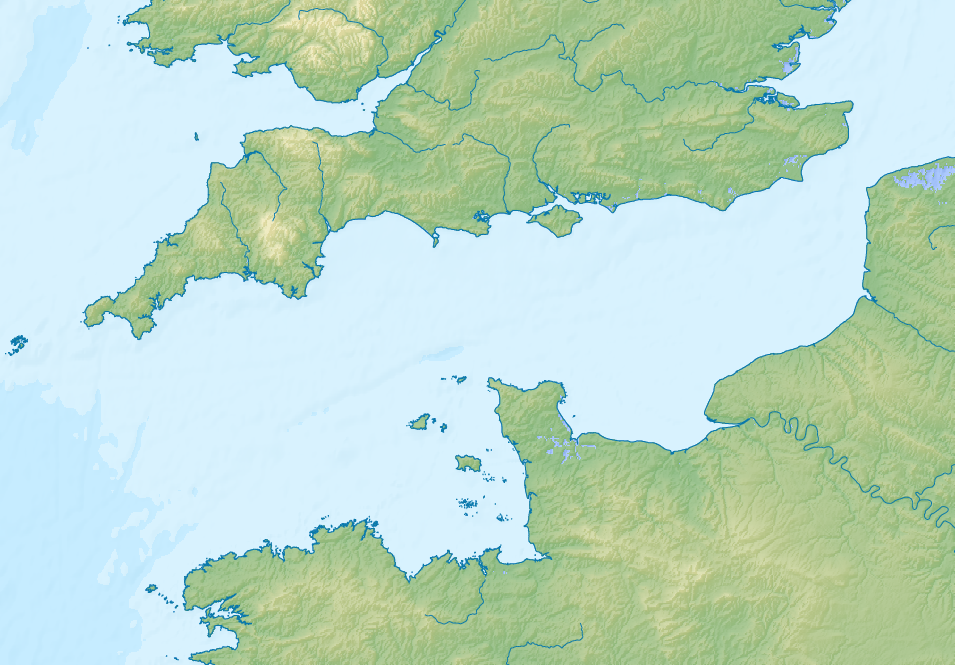
- Location within Normandy Battle of Saint-James (English Channel) Battle of Saint-James (France)

The battle of Saint-James took place between 27 February and 6 March 1426 between England and France, during the latter half of the Hundred Years' War.

== Forces ==
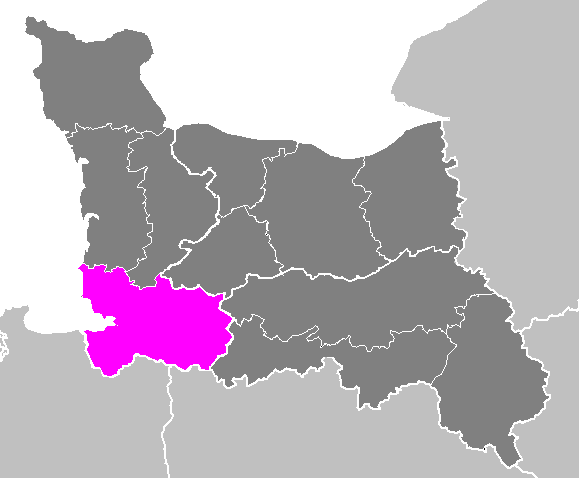
Avranches on the border of Normandy and Brittany

The battle was fought at Avranches, on the border of Normandy and Brittany, with the English led by Sir Thomas Rempston, while the French were led by Arthur de Richemont, the Constable of France. The English were victorious.

== Background ==
In late 1425, Jean, Duke of Brittany, had switched his allegiance from the English to Charles the dauphin. In retaliation, Sir Thomas Rempston invaded the duchy with a small army in January 1426, penetrating to the capital, Rennes, before falling back to St. James-de-Beuvron on the Norman frontier. The duke of Brittany's brother, Arthur de Richemont, newly made constable of France, rushed to his brother's aid. Richemont hastily levied an army across Brittany in February and gathered his forces in Antrain. The newly assembled Breton force first captured Pontorson, executing all the surviving English defenders and entirely destroying the wall after seizing the city. By the end of February, Richemont's army then marched on St. James. Rempston was heavily outnumbered, with 600 men to Richemont's feudal horde of 16,000.

== Battle ==
As the Breton force approached, English troops came out in reconnaissance but were soon driven back into the walls after a swift fight. The constable had with him a powerful force of artillery and then proceeded to bombard the city from several sides. The bombardment lasted for a week, during which the defenders unsuccessfully tried several sorties that all ended with them retreating into the walls. After several days of bombardment, two large breaches were made in the walls.

Richemont was reluctant to launch a full assault with troops of such poor quality, but he was running low on funds and his failure to pay troops had already caused some of his men to desert despite the short duration of the siege. After holding a council of war with his officers, he decided to assault the walls through the two breaches.

On the 6th of March the French attacked in force. All day Rempston's troops held the breaches, but there was no let-up in the constable's assault. At some point, men from Richemont's main force mistook for enemy relief a returning detachment, that had been previously tasked by the constable to survey the other side of the city, and panic ensued among the largely ill-trained Breton militia. The English defenders immediately decided to capitalize on this unexpected rout and came out of the city to inflict heavy losses on the fleeing Breton troops. During the chaotic retreat, hundreds of men drowned crossing the nearby river while many others fell to the deadly bolts of the defenders' crossbows. The remnants of the disorganized feudal militia, technically defeated by an enemy 26 times their inferior, straggled back to camp, thoroughly demoralized. Any attempts Richemont may have made to rally them were unsuccessful and, in the night, they burned their tents and baggage and fell back in disorder to their point of departure near Fougres. Six hundred were dead, 50 captured, and 18 standards lost. The remainder soon disbanded.

== Aftermath ==
Two days later the Earl of Suffolk arrived, bringing 1500 men. Intent on exploiting the victory, he at once set out for Rennes, 45 miles to the west. Halfway there, he captured the town of Dol without difficulty, as neither Jean nor Richemont offered resistance. Here he found he need not resume the advance, for the duke had offered a three-month truce. Suffolk agreed. After a brief outbreak of fighting next year the turncoat duke sought rapprochement with his erstwhile allies, and signed a treaty with the Duke of Bedford by which he accepted Henry VI of England as king of France.
