= Lord William Bentinck (ship) =

Several ships have been named after Lord William Bentinck.

Two were launched in 1828, and the coincidence of name and year of launch, and both having carried convicts to Tasmania, has resulted in some sources conflating the two vessels, e.g., Hackman.

- Lord William Bentinck (1828 Yarmouth ship), of 443 tons (bm), launched at Yarmouth. She made one voyage transporting convicts to Tasmania, and three voyages transporting settlers to New Zealand; she was wrecked c.1859.
- Lord William Bentinck (1828 Bristol ship), of 564 tons (bm), launched at Bristol. She made one voyage for the British East India Company and one transporting convicts to Tasmania. She was wrecked in 1840 at Bombay.
- Lord William Bentinck (1832), the first steamer built for the East India Company to introduce its regular services on the River Ganges. Also the first iron steamer constructed on the Thames, she was built and engined by Maudslay, Sons and Field at Lambeth and shipped to India in 1832. She sank in a typhoon on 3 June 1842 in Calcutta.
