= John Bowes (speaker) =

English politician (c.1383–1444)

John Bowes (c. 1383 – c. 1444) was Speaker of the House of Commons of England between October 1435 and December 1435.

He was the son of John Bowes of Costock, Nottinghamshire but raised as the ward of Sir Thomas Rempstone. He was trained as a lawyer and practised law in Nottinghamshire.

In 1428 he was appointed Escheator for Nottinghamshire and Derbyshire. In 1429, 1432, 1435 and 1439 he was elected knight of the shire (MP) for Nottinghamshire, being elected Speaker of the House in October 1435.

Thereafter he returned to the law and was appointed Recorder of London, serving as the MP for the city of London in 1442.

He died some time in 1444 and, Bowes having no children, his estate passed to his brother William.

Political offices
Preceded by Roger Hunt	Speaker of the House of Commons; 1435	Succeeded by Sir John Tyrell
