= William Cavendish-Bentinck =

William Cavendish-Bentinck may refer to:

- Charles William Frederick Cavendish-Bentinck (1817–1865), Church of England clergyman
- Lord William Charles Augustus Cavendish-Bentinck (1780–1826), great-great-grandfather of Queen Elizabeth II
- Lord William Bentinck (1774–1839), British statesman
- William Cavendish-Bentinck, 3rd Duke of Portland (1738–1809), British prime minister
- William Cavendish-Bentinck, 6th Duke of Portland (1857–1943), Knight of the Garter
- William Cavendish-Bentinck, 7th Duke of Portland (1893–1977), 2nd Chancellor of the University of Nottingham
- William George Cavendish-Bentinck (1854–1909), British Member of Parliament for Penryn and Falmouth, 1886–1895
