= Richard Whalley (died 1583) =

English politician

Richard Whalley (1498/99–1583), of Kirton, Welbeck and Sibthorpe, Nottinghamshire and Wimbledon, Surrey, was an English politician.

== Family ==
Whalley was the only son of Thomas Whalley of Kirton, and his second wife Elizabeth née Strelley, the daughter of John Strelley of Woodborough, Nottinghamshire. Whalley married three times and had twenty-five recorded children. Firstly, Laura née Brockman, daughter of Thomas Brockman or Brookman of Essex. They had five children. By 1540, he had married his second wife, Ursula. Her maiden name is unrecorded, and they had thirteen children. His third wife, Barbara, we also know little of, but they had seven children together.

== Education and career ==
Whalley was educated at St. John’s College, Cambridge.

He was a Member (MP) of the Parliament of England for Scarborough in 1547, East Grinstead in April 1554, and Nottinghamshire in November 1554 and 1555.

He was one of several Nottinghamshire gentry involved in the contentious dissolution of Lenton Priory in 1538.
