= Thomas Chaworth =

English landowner and Member of Parliament

Sir Thomas Chaworth (died 1459) was an English landowner and Member of Parliament. He and his second wife, Isabel Chaworth, became one of the richest families in England when his wife unexpectedly inherited the estate of Hugh Aylesbury of Milton Keynes.

== Life ==
Thomas Chaworth was the son and heir of Alice and Sir William Chaworth of Wiverton and Alfreton. His mother Alice (née Caltoft) brought a considerable fortune to the family. She was the heir to her fathers manors at Wiverton, East Bridgford, Saxby, West Allington and South Thoresby, Lincolnshire. His father died in 1398 and his mother died in 1400.

Chaworth succeeded his father in 1398 and was knighted in 1401.

From 1401 he served on many public commissions throughout his life.

He was appointed Sheriff of Nottinghamshire and Derbyshire for 1403, 1417 and 1423. He was Sheriff of Lincolnshire for 1408 and 1418.

He was elected to Parliament as knight of the shire (MP) for Nottinghamshire in 1406, followed by a term as MP for Derbyshire in 1413, after which he was again returned for Nottinghamshire several times between 1417 and 1445.

He was a justice of the peace for Nottinghamshire from 1404 to 1417, 1419 to 1424 and 1429 to his death and for Derbyshire from 1444 to his death.

He married first to Nicola, daughter of Sir Reynold Braybrooke. Their sole child Elizabeth Chaworth married John Scrope, 4th Baron Scrope of Masham, an English peer, Privy Councillor and Treasurer of England.

Thomas Chaworth married secondly to Isabel, the daughter of Sir Thomas Aylesbury. Isabel became the coheiress of Hugh Aylesbury of Milton Keynes, Buckinghamshire following the deaths of her brother in 1422 and her nephew in 1423. As a result, she received property and estates in Hertfordshire, Northamptonshire, Oxfordshire, Wiltshire, and Buckinghamshire, which provided her an annual income of £320, equivalent to £340,721 in 2025.

Chaworth commissioned the Wollaton Antiphonal, which was completed in 1430 and used in his private chapel.

Thomas and his second wife Isabel had several sons and a daughter. They were buried at Launde where there was a brass plate memorial. He was succeeded by his eldest, and "sekely" son William.
