= John Annesley =

English politician (died 1410)

Sir John Annesley (died 1410) was an English politician. He sat as MP for Nottinghamshire in January 1377, October 1377, 1378, 1379, November 1384, 1385, 1386, February 1388, and September 1388.

He was knighted by March 1373.

== Offices held ==
He also served as commissioner of inquiry in Nottinghamshire in 1375 concerning liability to repair roads, in February 1390 concerning blockage of the River Trent, in August 1390 concerning holdings of the late Lord Basset of Drayton, in June 1391 concerning blockage of the Trent, and commissioner of array in March 1392.

He also served as surveyor of a tax in Nottinghamshire in August 1379 and tax collector in December 1384.

== Family ==
He was the son and heir of Sir John Annesley. By March 1375, he was married to Isabel, the daughter of Sir Richard Damory by his wife Margaret, sister and coheiress of Sir John Chandos (died without heir in 1369) and the sister and coheiress of Richard Damory (died without heir in 1375). He had no children with Isabel. He married his second wife, Margaret (fl. 1412) and possibly had one son.
