= Prince Giuseppe Emanuele Ventimiglia =

Italian politician

Prince of Belmonte
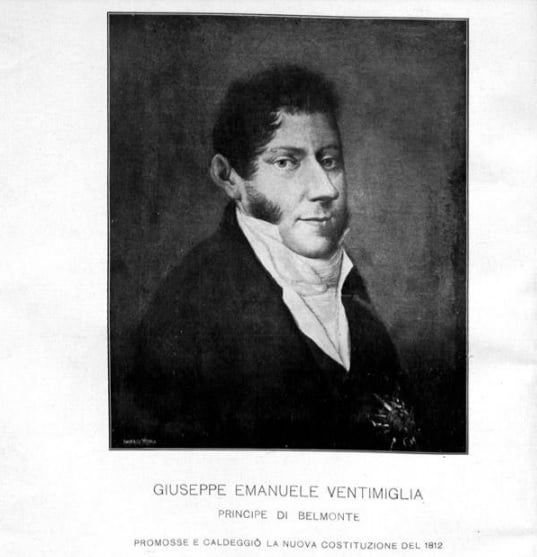
- Tenure: 1777 – 1814
- Other names: Giuseppe Emanuele Ventimiglia Cottone
- Known for: Sicilian Constitution 1812
- Born: Palermo, Sicily
- Died: Paris, France
- Occupation: landowner, member of the Sicilian Parliament

Prince Giuseppe Emauele Ventimiglia (1766-1814) was a Sicilian politician. He was a Member of the Parliament of the Kingdom of Sicily. He was instrumental along with Paolo Balsamo and his uncle Carlo Cottone prince of Castelnuovo in the improvement of the quality of life of the people. He led the project for the abolition of feudal rights in Sicily in 1806 and for the redaction of the Sicilian Constitution of 1812.

== Early life ==
Giuseppe Emanuele Ventimiglia was born in Palermo in 1766, the first son of Prince Vincenzo and his wife Anna Maria Cottone di Castelnuovo. At an early age he was sent to Rome to study in the Collegio del Nazareno and then took a grand tour of Europe, going through Italy, Switzerland, the German Empire, Hungary and Poland. During this stop he met Stanislao Poniatowski and accompanied him for his encounter with Catherine the Great. During this journey with the Empress he visited Kiev and Kherson, sailing on the Dnieper river. From Crimea he came back through Moldavia and Valachia, stopping at Bucharest, then through Prussia, Saxony then France and finally England. Back in Paris, he met cousin Charlotte Ventimille, of the French branch of his family, and married her, before returning to Palermo with her.

== Career ==
Cultural life there was led by a circle of intellectuals gravitating around his uncle Carlo, Prince of Castelnuovo. He had the chance to meet astronomer Giuseppe Piazzi and economist Paolo Balsamo amongst others. He joined the fight to protect the Accademia Palermitana degli Studi, threatened by King Ferdinand who wanted to clear it of liberal influences and hand it back to the Jesuits. Because of his ideas he became one of the key figures of the new Sicilian society under the British protectorate: he was held in esteem by British prime minister Charles Grey for a possible Anglo-Sicilian alliance to overshadow the Austrian influences of Queen Maria Carolina and her entourage, who were more favourable to the French of Murat.

To this end, Ventimiglia formed a militia of 30.000 armed men "for the preservation of the existing form of government, of the properties of the individuals, and the privileges of the various orders of society". Among these privileges was one that Ventimiglia considered intolerable: a fixed donation to Naples not sustained by any formal right and that more resembled a medieval donatio; he proposed its replacement with a land tax, to be eventually integrated with indirect taxation only if the former were to be insufficient.

He openly sustained Louis Philippe, Duke of Orléans, brother in law of the king, and asked the Queen to dismiss the Neapolitan ministers (especially Medici). He worked to create an independent Sicilian administration, one where the barons could have a meaningful role in the affairs of Sicily once Naples had been reconquered. Along with 43 other aristocrats, Ventimiglia was arrested on the night of 19 July 1811 and locked up with three others in the Castle of Saint James on the island of Favignana.

The formal accusation was based on a series of intercepted letters in which the prince had secretly corresponded with the Prince Regent, asking for a British intervention (armed if necessary) to defend the rights of the Sicilian population against the Crown. He remained imprisoned notwithstanding his poor health until 20 January 1812 when he was freed upon the intervention of lord Bentinck.

Immediately Ventimiglia and others started working on a draft for a new Sicilian Constitution, modelled after the British one that he considered the median way between monarchy and democracy. These works resulted in the Sicilian Constitution of 1812. Ties with England were made more apparent through Bentinck's appointment to the office of Foreign Secretary while Britain was keeping the island under her protection.

With the Restauration, King Ferdinand officially regained control of Sicily and as a result, Ventimiglia and his collaborators were dismissed. As an extreme measure to try and save the Sicilian Constitution on which he had worked for a decade, following the advice of his friend the Duke of Orleans, he went to Paris where he was received by King Louis XVIII who, even if congratulating him profusely for his achievements, did not undertake any formal obligation to put pressure on the Borbonic administration for the assurance of safeguards to the advantage of the Sicilian people or the keeping of the Constitution.

He died in Paris from tuberculosis in October 1814.

== Honours ==
- Cavaliere dell'Insigne e Reale Ordine di San Gennaro
