= John Molyneux (MP for Nottinghamshire) =

16th-century English politician

John Molyneux (died 1588), of Thorpe, Nottinghamshire, was an English politician.

He was a member (MP) of the parliament of England for Nottinghamshire in 1563.
