= Charles Pierrepont, 2nd Earl Manvers =

British naval officer and politician

Captain The Right Honourable The Earl Manvers
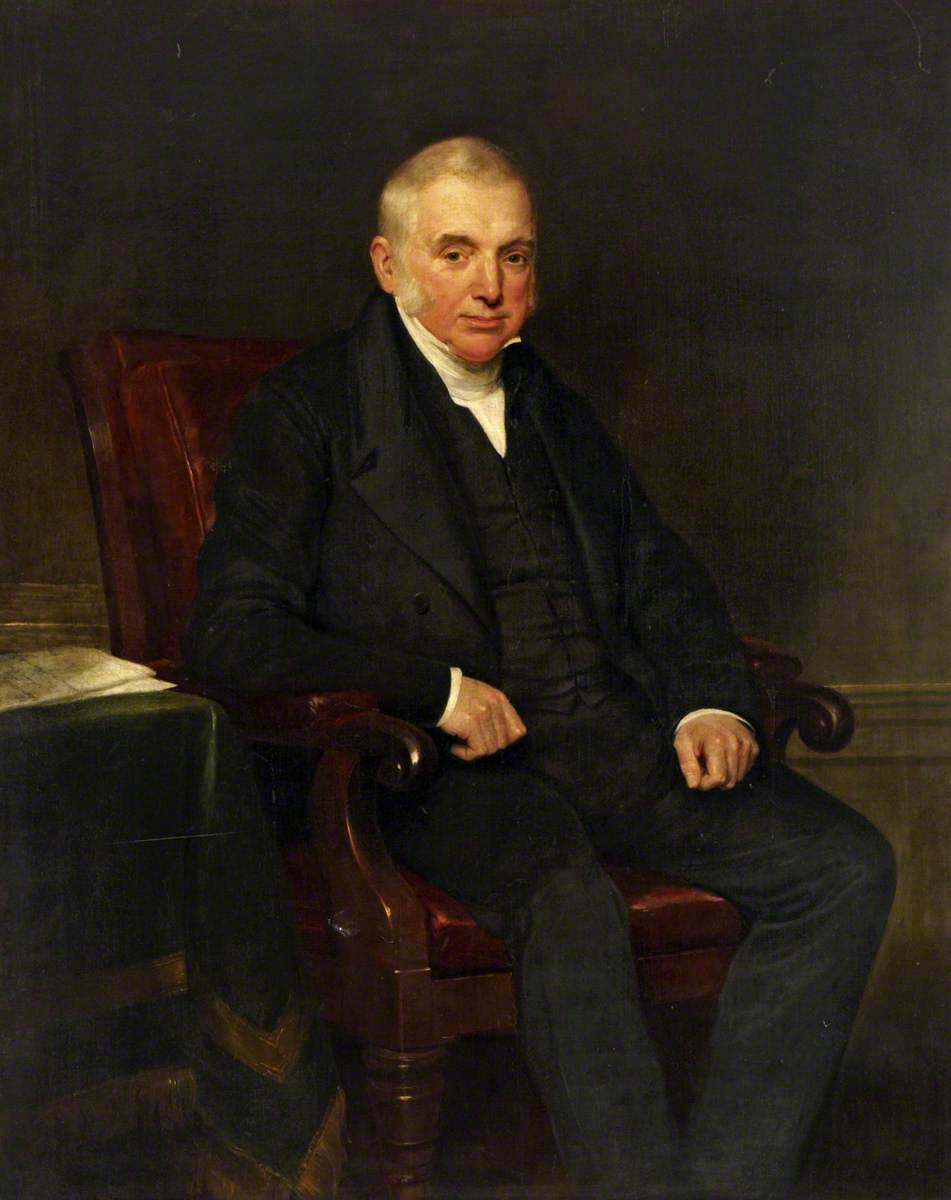

Member of Parliament for Nottinghamshire
- In office 1801–1816

Personal details
- Born: 11 August 1778
- Died: 27 October 1860 (aged 82)
- Party: Whig
- Spouse: Mary Laetitia Eyre
- Relations: Charles Pierrepont, 1st Earl Manvers (father); Evelyn Pierrepont (brother)

Military service
- Allegiance: Great Britain; United Kingdom
- Branch/service: Royal Navy
- Years of service: c.1790–1803
- Rank: Captain
- Commands: HMS Kingfisher; HMS Spartiate; HMS Dédaigneuse

Arms of Pierrepont: Argent semée of cinquefoils gules, a lion rampant sable

Charles Herbert Pierrepont, 2nd Earl Manvers (11 August 1778 – 27 October 1860) was an English hereditary peer and naval officer.

== Early life and education ==
Charles Pierrepont was the second son of Charles Pierrepont, 1st Earl Manvers and his wife Anne Orton Mills. His elder brother, who predeceased their father, was Evelyn Pierrepont who was a Member of Parliament. Charles succeeded to the earldom upon the death of their father in 1816.

== Naval career ==
Pierrepont entered the Royal Navy as a midshipman, and was made lieutenant on 10 March 1797, and on 11 August the same year commander of Kingfisher, a brig mounting 18 six-pounder guns, with a complement of 120 men. In her he captured the Lynx of 10 guns and 70 men, and also:

- On 15 September 1797 he captured the French privateer lugger Espoir of 2 guns and 39 men.
- On 8 January 1798, while about 150 nautical miles (280 km; 170 mi) west of the Burlings, he captured the Betsey, a French privateer ship of 16 guns and 118 men. She surrendered, having 9 men killed and wounded, while Kingsfisher had only 1 man wounded.
- On 26 May 1798 off Vigo, he captured the Spanish privateer lugger Avantivia Ferrolina, mounting one long gun and four swivels, with a crew of 26.

He was promoted to post-captain into the 74-gun Spartiate on 24 December 1798, and Kingfisher was taken over by his former first lieutenant, Frederick Maitland. Pierrepont returned to England in July 1799. He was subsequently appointed to the 40-gun frigate Dédaigneuse, but resigned his command following the death of his elder brother Evelyn in October 1801. He officially retired from the Navy in 1803.

== Political career ==
Pierrepont took over his brother's seat as Member of Parliament for Nottinghamshire. He became a deputy lieutenant of the county in 1803. In 1806, his father was created Earl Manvers, and Charles was styled Viscount Newark. He remained an MP until 1816, when he succeeded to the Earldom.

== Marriage and children ==
Mary Laetitia, Countess Manvers

Pierrepont married Mary Laetitia Eyre, of Grove Hall, Nottinghamshire (1784–1860), on 23 August 1804. They had four children:

- Charles Evelyn Pierrepont, Viscount Newark (2 September 1805 - 23 August 1850), MP for East Retford, 1830–1835.
- Sydney William Herbert Pierrepont, 3rd Earl Manvers (12 March 1825 - 16 January 1900)
- Lady Mary Frances Pierrepont (d. 12 June 1905), married Edward Christopher Egerton in 1845
- Lady Annora Charlotte Pierrepont (d. 22 March 1888), married Charles Watkin Williams-Wynn in 1853

== Death ==
Lord Manvers died in 1860 at the age of 83. He was succeeded in the earldom by his second, but eldest surviving son, Sydney.

== See also ==
- Thoresby Hall
- Holme Pierrepont Hall

Parliament of the United Kingdom
Preceded by Lord William Bentinck; Evelyn Pierrepont	Member of Parliament for Nottinghamshire; 1801–1816; With: Lord William Bentinck 1801–1803, 1812–1814; Anthony Hardolph Eyre 1802–1813; Frank Sotheron 1814–1816	Succeeded by Frank Sotheron; Lord William Bentinck
Peerage of Great Britain
Preceded by Charles Pierrepont	Earl Manvers; 1816–1860	Succeeded by Sydney Pierrepont
