= Thomas Rempston (KG) =

English politician

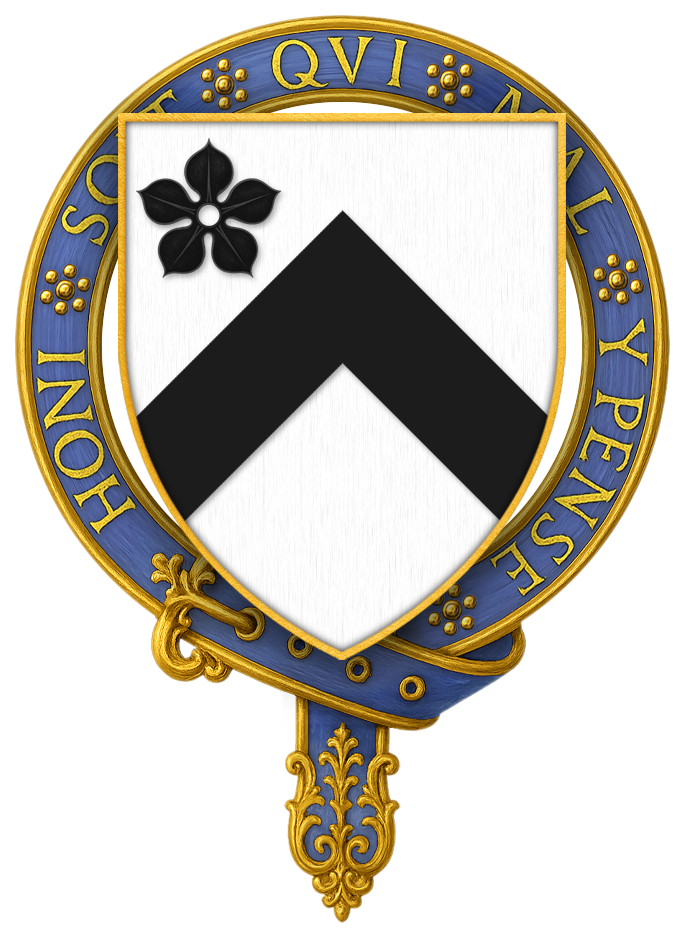
Arms of Sir Thomas Rempston, KG

Sir Thomas Rempston (or Ramston) KG (died 1406) was Constable of the Tower and an MP.

He was born the son of John Rempston at Rempstone, Nottinghamshire, where the family had long been settled.

In 1381, he was Knight of the Shire for Nottinghamshire, which he also represented in the parliaments of 1382, 1393, and 1395, and served as Sheriff of Nottinghamshire for 1393. In 1398, he adopted the cause of Henry, Earl of Derby, who had been exiled by Richard II, and in the following year, made his way to France to join the earl. He was one of the fifteen lances who embarked with Henry at Boulogne and landed at Ravenspur in July 1399. In Shakespeare's Richard II (act ii. scene i. 298) his name is given as Sir John Ramston, probably to suit the metre. On 7 October, he was appointed Constable of the Tower, and in this capacity had custody of Richard II; he was present at Richard's abdication, and was one of the witnesses to the form of resignation signed by the king.

In February 1400, he was on a commission to inquire into treasons in London and the neighbourhood, and shortly after, was appointed admiral of the fleet from the Thames eastwards; in August, he was made a knight of the Garter, and about the same time, steward of the king's household.

In 1401, he was made admiral of the fleet from the Thames westwards, and was placed on a commission to deal with infractions of the truce with France, and to settle the question of the still unpaid ransom of the late King John. He was summoned to the great council held in that year. In December 1402, he was negotiating with the Duke of Orleans, and, after prolonged negotiations, concluded a treaty with the French at Lůllingen on 17 June 1403.

In 1404-05, he was made a member of the privy council, and was recommended by parliament to Henry IV as one of those whose services merited special recognition; in the same year, he was employed on a mission to the Duke of Burgundy. Early in 1406, he was captured by French pirates while crossing the Thames from Queenborough to Essex, but was soon released; in the same year, he was vice-chamberlain to the king. He was drowned in the Thames, close to the Tower, on 31 October 1406.

Rempston was the founder of his family's fortunes; he acquired extensive property in Nottinghamshire, including the manor of Bingham, which he made his seat. He married Margaret, daughter of Sir Simon Leeke, and widow of Sir Godfrey Foljambe; by her he had several children, including a notable son, Thomas Rempston. Margaret survived him.

Political offices
Preceded by The Duke of Aumale	Constable of the Tower; 1399–1406	Succeeded by The Duke of York
