= Edward Cludd =

Edward Cludd (1603–1678) was a Justice of the Peace and Knight of the Shire for the County of Nottingham during the Interregnum. He supported the Parliamentary cause in the English Civil War.

== Biography ==
Cludd was born at Arnold and lived in the house he built called Norwood Park. As a Justice of the Peace, he married many persons under an oak in Norwood Park, which became known as "Cludd's Oak".

During the First Civil War and was an influential figure in the county of Nottingham. It was by his invitation, and under his protection the Commissioners of Scotland resided, and held their consultations in the archiepiscopal palace at Southwell. It was he through his interest in antiquity and friendship with Oliver Cromwell who prevented the destruction of Southwell Cathedral.

During the Protectorate (1653–1659) he sat in the Barebones Parliament (1653), and the Second Protectorate Parliament (1657–1658), for the County of Nottingham.

William Dickinson wrote that he was "a very moderate, temperate man, by no means an enemy to monarchy, though a strenuous opposer of the government as administered by Charles".
