= William Bentinck (priest) =

English Anglican priest (1784-1868)

The Venerable William Bentinck
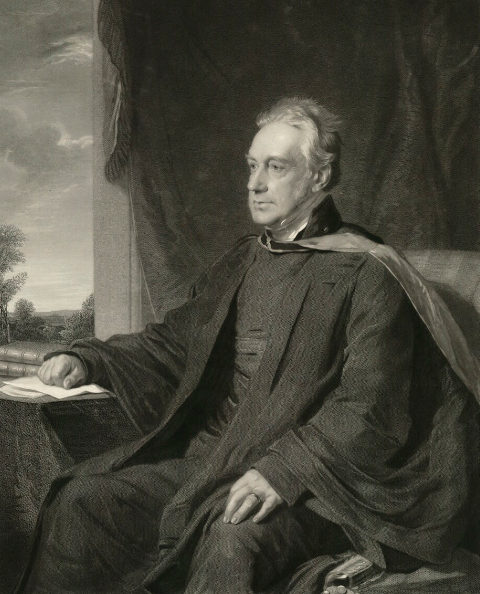
- W. H. E. Bentinck, engraving by Samuel Bellin after a portrait by George Richmond
- Born: 2 February 1784
- Died: 29 September 1868 (aged 84)
- Education: Westminster School; Christ Church, Oxford
- Occupation: Anglican priest
- Spouse: Frances Constable (m. 1814)
- Parents: Lord Edward Bentinck (father); Elizabeth Cumberland (mother)
- Relatives: 2nd Duke of Portland (paternal grandfather); 3rd Duke of Portland (uncle); Richard Cumberland (maternal grandfather); Thomas Constable (father-in-law)

William Harry Edward Bentinck (Note: The second forename is given as Henry not Harry in some sources. However, sources directly associated with Westminster Abbey give Harry.) (2 February 1784 – 29 September 1868) was an Anglican clergyman, who served as Archdeacon of Westminster.

Bentinck was the oldest son of Lord Edward Bentinck (son of the 2nd Duke of Portland and younger brother of the 3rd Duke of Portland, the Prime Minister) and his wife Elizabeth Cumberland, daughter of the dramatist Richard Cumberland.

He was educated at Westminster School and Christ Church, Oxford, matriculating in 1802 aged 18, graduating B.A. 1805, M.A. 1808. He was ordained deacon on 4 May 1807, and priest on 7 February 1808.

Soon after his ordination, Bentinck was appointed Rector of Sigglesthorne, East Riding of Yorkshire, after King George III accepted the recommendation of the Prime Minister (Bentinck's uncle the Duke of Portland) on 27 February 1808. He was appointed domestic chaplain to Edward Venables-Vernon, Archbishop of York in January 1810. He was a canon of Westminster Abbey 1809–1864, becoming rural dean in 1842 and Archdeacon of Westminster. (Note: Although reference works state that he became Archdeacon of Westminster in 1854, Bentinck is already listed as Archdeacon of Westminster in sources from 1843 and 1846.) He resigned in October 1864.

On 19 July 1814, Bentinck married Frances Constable, daughter of Archdeacon Thomas Constable.

Bentinck paid for the construction of Holy Trinity Church, Bessborough Gardens, opened in 1852. (After suffering damage in World War II, the church was demolished in 1954.)
