= William Neville (Lollard knight) =

English knight (c. 1341–1391)

Sir William Neville (c. 1341 – 19 October 1391) was an English Lollard knight, and constable of Nottingham Castle. He was a crusader with his Lollard brother (and possible lover) John Clanvowe, with whom he was buried inside the Arap Mosque in Istanbul.

== Biography ==
Sir William Neville was a knight of the chamber to King Richard II of England and was named constable of Nottingham castle. He was son of Ralph Neville, 2nd Baron Neville.

== Robin Hood legend ==
Nottingham historian Tony Scupham-Bilton has suggested that there is a gay undertone to the Robin Hood legend. The link with Robin Hood dates back 700 years and it is due to the relationship between Sir William Neville and Sir John Clanvowe. The two shared a special bond, despite the fact Sir William had a wife, firstly Elizabeth Le Waleys and secondly Alice de St. Philbert. Clanvowe, a poet, wrote a ballad in honor of a visit of King Richard II to Nottingham castle, "The Jest of Robin Hood". According to Scupham-Bilton, the background of the ballad was Clanvowe's own relationship with Neville. The two of them had a ceremony of "wedded brotherhood". Neville and Clanvowe died on pilgrimage near Constantinople, Neville two days later than Clanvowe.

In an entry for 1391 in the chronicle compiled in the XIV century by the monks of Westminster Abbey, it is written that William Neville died of grief for the death of John Clanvowe: "It was also on October 17, that in a village near Constantinople in Greece the life of Sir John Clanvowe, a distinguished knight, came to its close, causing to his companion on the march, Sir William Neville, for whom his love was no less than for himself, such inconsolable sorrow that he never took food again and two days afterward breathed his last, greatly mourned, in the same village. These two knights were men of high repute among the English, gentlemen of mettle and descended from illustrious families."

Their tombstone was sculpted with two helms kissing each others, and was discovered in 1913 inside the Arap Mosque. It is now preserved at the İstanbul Archaeology Museums.
