= Evelyn Pierrepont (MP) =

British politician

The Honourable Evelyn Henry Frederick Pierrepont (18 January 1775 – 22 October 1801), was a British Member of Parliament.

Pierrepont was the eldest son of Charles Pierrepont, 1st Earl Manvers, by Anne, daughter of William Mills, of Richmond, Surrey. Charles Pierrepont, 2nd Earl Manvers and Henry Pierrepont were his younger brothers.

Pierrepont was returned to parliament for Bossiney in April 1796, but already the following month he succeeded his father (who had been ennobled as Viscount Newark) as Member of Parliament for Nottinghamshire, a seat he held until his early death five years later.

Pierrepont died in October 1801, aged 26, predeceasing his father. He was replaced by his brother Charles as MP for Nottinghamshire. His memorial is in St. Edmund's Church, Holme Pierrepont.

Parliament of Great Britain
Preceded by James Archibald Stuart; Humphrey Minchin	Member of Parliament for Bossiney; 1796; With: James Archibald Stuart	Succeeded by John Stuart-Wortley; John Lubbock
Preceded by Lord Edward Bentinck; Charles Pierrepont	Member of Parliament for Nottinghamshire; 1796–1801; With: Lord William Bentinck	Succeeded by Parliament of the United Kingdom
Parliament of the United Kingdom
Preceded by Parliament of Great Britain	Member of Parliament for Nottinghamshire; 1801; With: Lord William Bentinck	Succeeded by Lord William Bentinck; Hon. Charles Pierrepont
