= George Musgrave (MP) =

18th-century British politician

George Musgrave (c. 1740 – 27 March 1824), of Kepier, co. Durham, was Member of Parliament for Carlisle in 1768–1774.
