= Charles Pierrepont, 1st Earl Manvers =

British naval officer and politician

Captain The Right Honourable The Earl Manvers
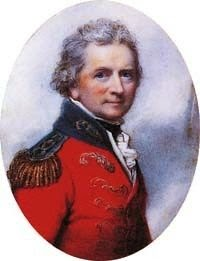

Member of the Great Britain Parliament for Nottinghamshire
- In office 1778–1796

Personal details
- Born: Charles Medows; 4 November 1737
- Died: 17 June 1816 (aged 78)
- Spouse: Anne Orton Mills
- Children: Evelyn Henry Frederick Pierrepont; Charles Herbert Pierrepont; Henry Manvers Pierrepont; Philip Sydney Pierrepont; Frances Augusta Pierrepont

Military service
- Allegiance: Great Britain
- Branch/service: Royal Navy
- Years of service: 1747–1769
- Rank: Captain
- Commands: HMS Albany; HMS Shannon; HMS Isis
- Battles/wars: Seven Years' War; Siege of Louisbourg

Arms of Pierrepont: Argent semée of cinquefoils gules, a lion rampant sable

Charles Pierrepont, 1st Earl Manvers (born Charles Meadows, or Medows; 4 November 1737 – 17 June 1816) was a British naval officer and politician who sat in the House of Commons from 1778 to 1796 when he was raised to the peerage as Viscount Newark.

== Early life ==
He was the second son of Philip Meadows (1708–1781), deputy ranger of Richmond Park, by his marriage to Lady Frances Pierrepont (1711–1795), daughter of William, Earl of Kingston. Charles Medows was the great-grandson and the heir apparent of Evelyn Pierrepont, 1st Duke of Kingston-upon-Hull.

William, Earl of Kingston, predeceased his father, Evelyn Pierrepont, 1st Duke of Kingston-Upon-Hull; thus the Dukedom and estates devolved on William's son, Evelyn Pierrepont, 2nd Duke of Kingston-upon-Hull, who was Lady Frances's brother. The 2nd Duke, however, died childless, leaving Charles Medows, his nephew, as the eventual heir to the estates.

== Family's royal and political connections ==
Charles (Medows) Pierrepont, 1st Earl Manvers was the great-grandson of Sir Philip Meadows (d. 1718), the successful parliamentarian. In 1710, Sir Philip's fellow parliamentarian, Sir John Guise, 3rd Bart., was "informed by Queen Anne that Sir Philip had been promised the position as Envoy to Hanover, the role Guise had envisaged for himself. Sir Philip Meadows was knighted in 1658, made Knight Marshal by Oliver Cromwell and sent as an Ambassador to Sweden and Denmark.

In 1717, Sir Philip's son, Sir Philip Meadowes (d. 1757), was one of the twelve members of the Board of General Officers, working with Sir Robert Walpole, the First Commissioner (Lord) of the Treasury. Earlier, on 2 July 1700 he was appointed, as his father had been, knight-marshal of the King's Household, and was formally knighted by King William on 23 December 1700 at Hampton Court. Sir Philip's daughter, Mary (1713–1743), was a Maid of honour to Queen Caroline and his first cousin was Philip Meadows (1679–1752), who had been Mayor of Norwich in 1734. On 29 May of that year, Prime Minister Sir Robert Walpole presented Mayor Meadows with his personal gift: the city's new silver mace which bore Walpole's own coat-of-arms. Like Prime Minister Walpole, Mayor Meadows had accumulated vast wealth owing to their success with the South Sea Company.

Another of Sir Philip's sons, Sir Sidney Meadows, was also knight-marshal of the Kings Palace. Sidney died in Andover in 1792. Like his brother Philip, Sidney was Deputy Ranger of Richmond Park and worked under Prime Minister John Stuart, 3rd Earl of Bute who, by 1761, had been appointed Ranger by George III. At this time - shortly after he ascended the throne in 1760 - the King was sold the Rangership by his daughter Princess Amelia. King George, having appointed the third Lord Bute as Ranger, continued to keep up an interest in the park and instigated many repairs and improvements with Sir Sidney (and at times his brother Philip) as deputy. When Lord Bute died in 1792 the King took the Rangership back into his own keeping and for a short time areas were given over to farming. Sir Sydney died in 1792, aged 91, having worked alongside the King, managing the park's agricultural and grazing branches.

== Naval career ==
Educated at Oxford, Medows became a midshipman in the Royal Navy and was promoted to lieutenant on 7 August 1755. He became a commander on 5 April 1757 in Renown, a 20-gun sloop, but on 17 August the same year was promoted to post-captain in the frigate Shannon, and was ordered to join the Mediterranean Fleet. He commanded her until April 1761, when Vice-Admiral Saunders appointed him to the 50-gun frigate Isis, replacing Captain Edward Wheeler, who had been killed during the capture of the Oriflamme. Medows continued on Isis, in the Mediterranean, until the end of the war in 1763, and in 1769 retired altogether from the Navy.

In 1773, Medows's uncle, Evelyn Pierrepont, 2nd Duke of Kingston-upon-Hull, died and left his estates at Thoresby and elsewhere to his wife Elizabeth, Duchess of Kingston, the former wife of the Earl of Bristol. The duke's nephews challenged the will on the grounds of bigamy, and the proceedings which followed established that the marriage of the Duchess had indeed been bigamous. However, this was found not to affect her inheritance, so she was able to retain the Pierrepont estates until her death, which took place in August 1788. Upon inheriting the estates, Medows adopted the surname of Pierrepont by Royal Licence.

A watercolour sketch entitled In Captain Pierrepont's Grounds was made by the Preston-born artist Anthony Devis (1729–1817).

== Political career ==
His family's political dynasty ensured that Medows was a well connected, if not terribly effective parliamentarian. As a Whig, Medows had been on good terms with Horace Walpole, the son of Prime Minister Sir Robert Walpole. Horace had voiced his concern about the impending death of Medows' uncle, the 2nd Duke of Kingston. With the patronage of the prime minister's protégé, Thomas Pelham Holles, 1st Duke of Newcastle, Medows was returned as one of the Members of Parliament for Nottinghamshire in December 1778. He continued to sit in the Commons as a knight of the shire until he was ennobled in 1796. In Parliament, Medows (Pierrepont) supported the Duke of Portland, whose influence helped him to be raised to the peerage as Baron Pierrepont, of Holme Pierrepont in the County of Nottingham, and Viscount Newark, of Newark-on-Trent in the County of Nottingham, on 23 July 1796, and on 1 April 1806 he was promoted to an earldom as Earl Manvers. In the Lords, Manvers supported agricultural reform and was vice-president of the Board of Agriculture in 1803. He died in 1816 and was buried at Holme Pierrepont.

== Family and children ==
He married Anne Orton, daughter of William Mills of Richmond, in 1774. They had five children:

- Hon. Evelyn Henry Frederick Pierrepont (1775–1801).
- Charles Herbert Pierrepont, 2nd Earl Manvers (1778–1860).
- Hon. Henry Manvers Pierrepont (1780–1858).
- Hon. Philip Sydney Pierrepont (13 June 1786 – 15 February 1864), of Evenley Hall, Northamptonshire, married on 19 August 1810 Georgiana Browne, died without issue.
- Lady Frances Augusta Pierrepont (d. 1847), married on 20 October 1802 Admiral William Bentinck (1746–1813), married on 30 July 1821 Henry William Stephens.

Parliament of Great Britain
Preceded by Earl of Lincoln; Lord Edward Bentinck	Member of Parliament for Nottinghamshire; 1778–1796; With: Lord Edward Bentinck	Succeeded by Lord William Bentinck; Hon. Evelyn Pierrepont
Peerage of the United Kingdom
New creation	Earl Manvers; 1806–1816	Succeeded by Charles Pierrepont
Peerage of Great Britain
New creation	Viscount Newark; 2nd creation 1796–1816	Succeeded by Charles Pierrepont
