= Thomas Rempston (died 1458) =

Member of the Parliament of England

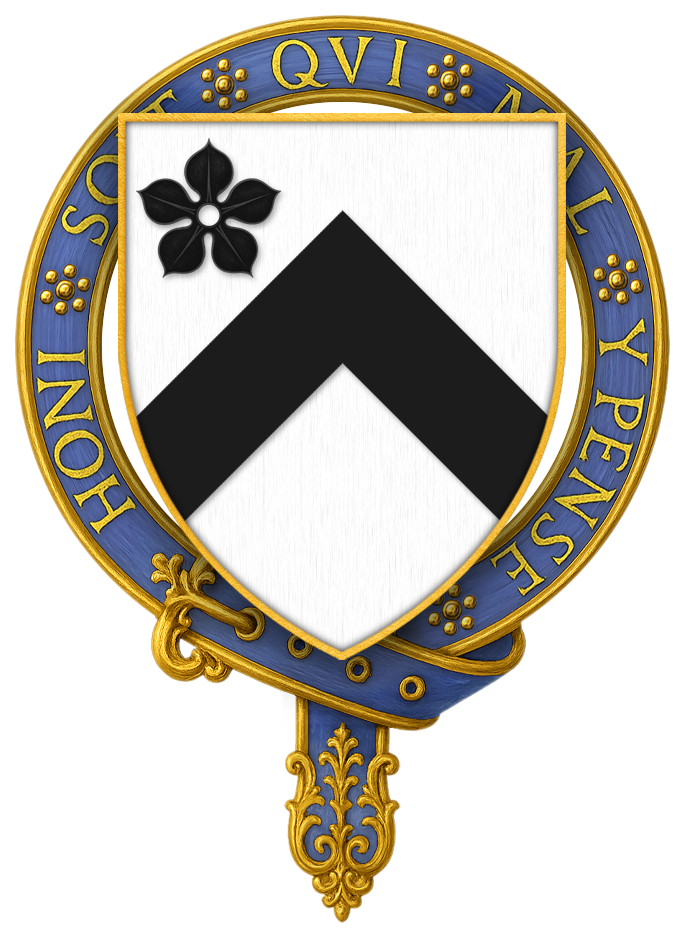
- Arms of Thomas' father Sir Thomas Rempston, KG
- Born: shortly before 1392 (Note: Rempston's birth date is not known. In Rawcliffe 1993 it is stated that he was unlikely to have come of age much before Henry V became king in 1413, meaning he had probably already reached the age of 21. Several genealogy websites cite 1389 as a possible year of birth.)
- Died: 15 October 1458
- Burial: Church of St. Mary and All Saints, Bingham
- Occupations: Soldier, administrator, diplomat, member of parliament
- Father: Thomas Rempston
- Military career
- Allegiance: Kingdom of England
- Active: 1415–1442
- Conflicts: Hundred Years' War: Battle of Agincourt (1415); Siege of Rouen (1418); Battle of Cravant (1423); Battle of St. James (1426); Siege of Orléans (1428); Battle of Rouvray (1429); Battle of Patay (1429) (surrendered); Siege of Tartas (1440); Siege of St. Sever (1442) (surrendered)

Sir Thomas Rempston II (or Rampston) (bef. 1392 – 15 October 1458) was a medieval English soldier, landowner, and a leading military commander during the Hundred Years' War in France. He dedicated his career, as his father had done before him, to the service of the House of Lancaster, the ruling dynasty of England. Much of the Rempston family's fortunes were in fact owed to this. However, several ransoms contracted by Sir Thomas while campaigning in France, coupled with the fact that his long-living mother held many of his estates in dower, meant that he had to endure several financial difficulties for much of his life.

== Family ==
Thomas was the son of Sir Thomas Rempston by his wife Margaret, daughter of Sir Simon Leeke. The Rempston family was an ancient Nottinghamshire family seated at Rempstone, since as early as the reign of Henry III of England.

== Life account ==
In 1413 and again in 1416 he represented Nottinghamshire in parliament. Rempston at this time was impoverished due to a settlement made by his father in favour of his mother, which prompted him to seek fortune on the wars in France. In 1415 he was present at the battle of Agincourt with eight men-at-arms and twenty-four foot soldiers. In 1417 he was appointed High Sheriff of Flintshire and Constable of Flint Castle for life.

In 1418 he served at the siege of Rouen, and on its fall was appointed captain of Bellencombre (Seine-Inferieure), which was subsequently bestowed on him by royal gift. On 22 Nov. 1419 he was promoted to the command of Meulan; he was also granted the town of Gassay, made third chamberlain to the Duke of Bedford, and steward of the king's household.

In 1423 he took part in the battle of Cravant, and early in 1424 he went with John of Luxembourg to besiege Oisy in the Pas de Calais. After that fortress was taken he helped to besiege Guise in June of the same year. The garrison, however, did not surrender till early in 1425. Rempston then joined the Duke of Bedford in Paris.

In January 1426, when war had been declared with Brittany, he took part in the raid into Brittany, penetrating as far as Rennes, and returning with the booty into Normandy. He fortified himself in St. James-de-Beuvron, near Avranches, which Richemont attacked in February. The besiegers were thrown into confusion by a successful sortie, and Richemont was forced to retreat to Rennes, leaving much spoil in the hands of the English. Rempston, joined two days later (8 March 1425 – 1426) by the Earl of Suffolk, pushed on to Dol, taking a fortified monastery by the way.

Rempston held the barony of Gacé in Normandy.

In 1427 he assisted Warwick in the reduction of Pontorson; the garrison capitulated on 8 May 1427. By this time the Duke of Brittany was sufficiently alarmed, and a truce was negotiated in May for three months, which was soon afterwards converted into a peace. Two years later, he was present at the siege of Orléans, and shortly after he joined the force under Sir John Fastolf which went to the relief of Beaugency, Waurin, the chronicler, being in the army. Setting out from Paris, they were joined at Janville by Scales and Talbot, and Rempston took part in the council of war, in which, contrary to Fastolf's advice, it was decided to advance. In the battle of Patay (18 June 1429) which followed he was one of the commanders, and was taken prisoner by Taneguy du Chatel (one of the murderers of John the Fearless in 1419). He remained in prison until 1435, and a curious petition contains the terms of his ransom. He was shortly afterwards appointed seneschal of Guienne, and in that capacity won much popularity at Bordeaux. He took part in the siege of Tartas in 1440, under the Earl of Huntingdon.

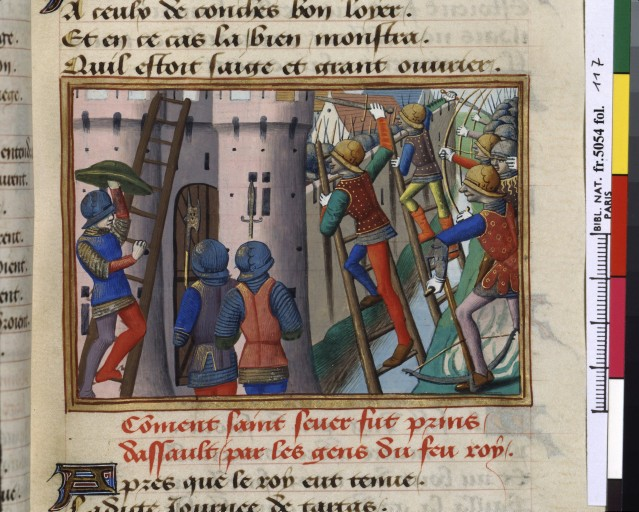
Illustration from Vigiles de Charles VII depicting the siege of St. Sever (1442), which saw Rempston captured

On late January 1441, with the siege of Tartas still ongoing, the English obtained terms for a conditional surrender: the town would capitulate if a French relief force failed to show up before 25 June 1442. Notably, Rempston also agreed with the Lord of Albret, to whom the viscounty of Tartas belonged, that if this deadline wasn't met by the French, Albret would also switch his allegiance, thus placing all of his lands under suzerainty of the English in southwestern France. This would have been disastrous for Charles VII, who would see large amounts of land in Gascony suddenly pass to enemy control, and so he mounted an expedition, the "Journée de Tartas", to relieve the town. The French arrived on 24 June 1442; the English were vastly outnumbered (receiving little or no support from England as efforts were focused on the defense of Normandy) and withdrew, thus the agreement came to nothing.

On 8 August 1441 he made a treaty with the counts of Penthièvre and Beaufort, by which all their possessions near Guienne were to be neutral for four years. He was taken prisoner when the dauphin took St. Sever in 1442, after the 'Journee de Tartas', but regained his liberty, and retook St. Sever, which the French in turn recaptured.

He died on 15 October 1458, and was buried in Bingham church, where there existed an alabaster monument to him in Thoroton's time. He married Alice, daughter of Thomas Bekering, and by her had: 1. Elizabeth (b. 1418), wife of John, afterwards Sir John Cheney; 2. Isabel, wife of Sir Brian Stapleton; 3. Margery, wife of Richard Bingham the younger. Both the Bingham and the Rempston estates afterwards passed to the Stapleton family.
