= Frank Sotheron =

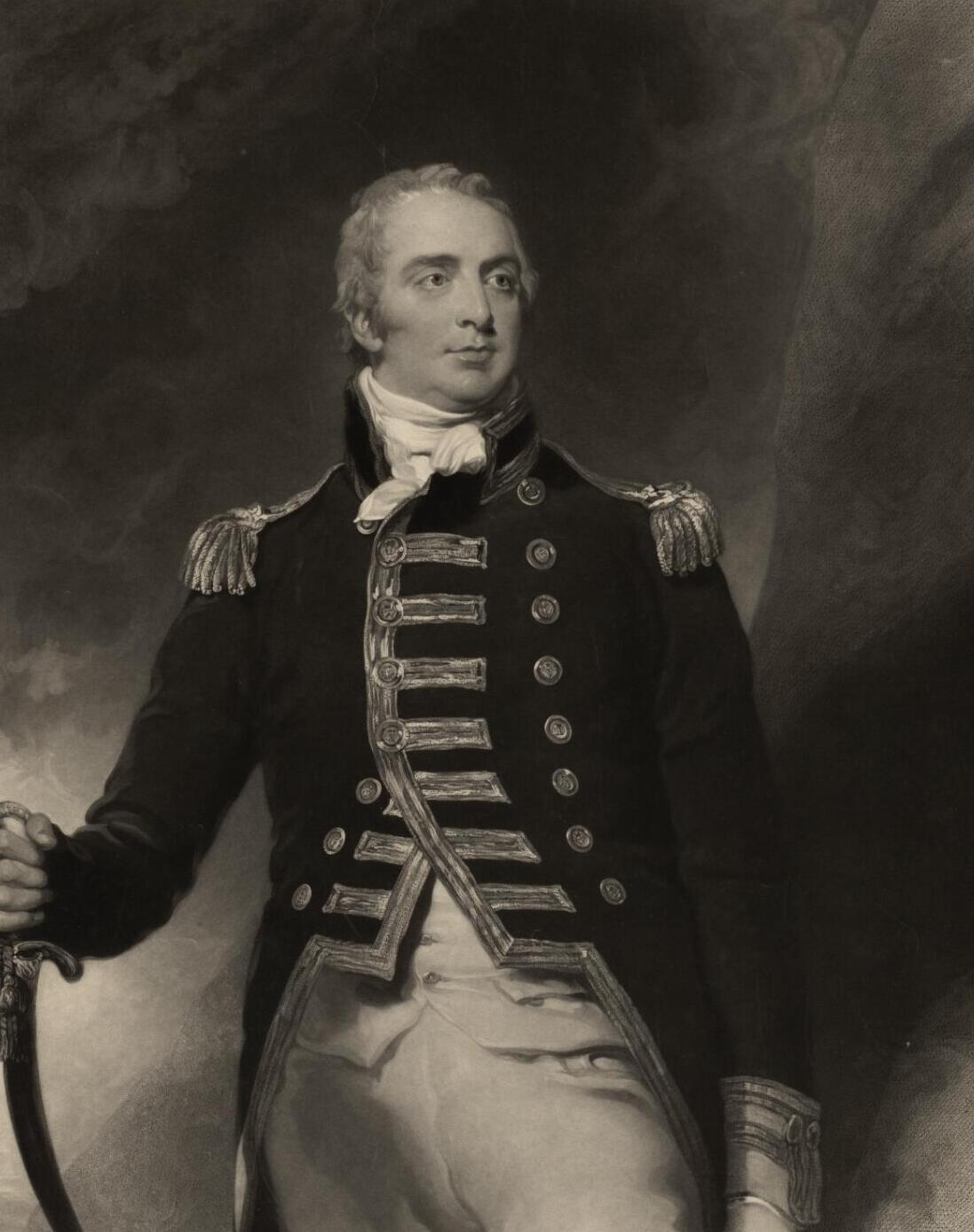

Admiral Frank Sotheron (1765–1839) was Member of Parliament for Nottinghamshire in the Parliament of the United Kingdom in the early 1800s.

== See also ==
- Marshall, John (1825). "Sotheron, Frank" . Royal Naval Biography. London: Longman and Company. pp. 499–505.
