= Lord William Bentinck =

British military commander and politician (1774–1839)

Lieutenant-General The Right Honourable William Bentinck GCB GCH PC
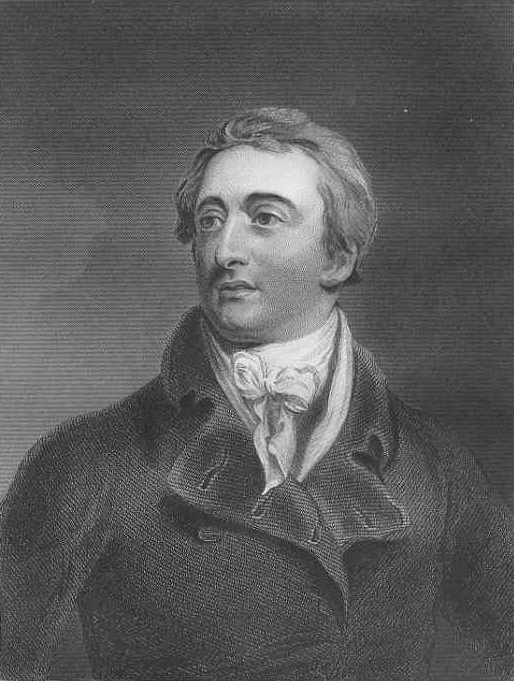
- Print after portrait by Thomas Lawrence

Governor-General of India
- In office 22 April 1834 – 20 March 1835
- Monarch: William IV
- Prime Minister: The Earl Grey; The Viscount Melbourne; The Duke of Wellington; Sir Robert Peel
- Succeeded by: Sir Charles Metcalfe (As Acting Governor-General)

Governor-General of the Presidency of Fort William
- In office 4 July 1828 – 22 April 1834
- Monarchs: George IV; William IV
- Prime Minister: The Duke of Wellington; The Earl Grey
- Preceded by: William Butterworth Bayley (Acting Governor-General)

Governor of Madras
- In office 30 August 1803 – 11 September 1807
- Monarch: George III
- Prime Minister: Henry Addington; William Pitt the Younger; The Lord Grenville
- Preceded by: The 2nd Baron Clive
- Succeeded by: William Petrie (Acting Governor)

Personal details
- Born: 14 September 1774 Buckinghamshire, England
- Died: 17 June 1839 (aged 64) Paris, France
- Party: Whig
- Spouse: Lady Mary Acheson (m. 1803)
- Parents: William Cavendish-Bentinck, 3rd Duke of Portland; Lady Dorothy Cavendish
- Education: Westminster School
- Awards: Knight Grand Cross of the Order of the Bath; Royal Guelphic Order

Military service
- Branch/service: British Army
- Years of service: 1791–1839
- Rank: Lieutenant-General
- Commands: 11th Regiment of Light Dragoons; Commander-in-Chief, India
- Battles/wars: Napoleonic Wars

Lieutenant-General William Henry Cavendish-Bentinck (14 September 1774 – 17 June 1839) better known as William Bentinck, was a British military commander and colonial administrator, who served as the first governor-general of India from 1828 to 1835.

He was Governor of Madras from 1803 to 1807, but was recalled when his tactless orders on military dress caused a mutiny. As commander of British troops in Sicily and later Naples and Genoa, he worked against the policy of the London government to encourage self-rule in Sicily and later further north in Italy. His policies were thwarted by London, and to some extent Italian lack of enthusiasm, and he was eventually recalled.

After several years in Parliament in London, he was again sent to India, as the first governor general of all the East India Company's domains. He has been credited for significant social and educational reforms in India, including abolishing sati, forbidding women to witness the cremations on the ghats of Varanasi, and suppressing female infanticide and human sacrifice.

Bentinck noted "the dreadful responsibility hanging over his head in this world and the next, if… he was to consent to the continuance of this practice (sati) one moment longer." After consultation with the army and officials, he passed the Bengal Sati Regulation, 1829. This was challenged by the Dharma Sabha which appealed in the Privy Council; however, the ban on sati was upheld.

He has been credited with reducing lawlessness by eliminating the supposed Thuggee with the aid of his chief captain, William Henry Sleeman. Along with Thomas Babington Macaulay he introduced English as the language of instruction in India.

Mysore was annexed under his presidency.

== Background ==
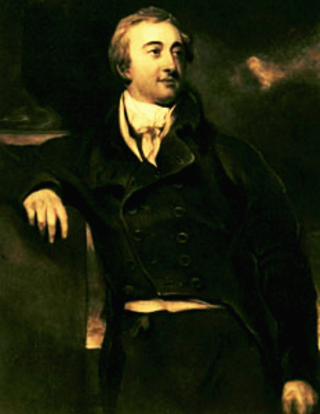
Portrait by Thomas Lawrence, 1804

Bentinck was born in Buckinghamshire, the second son of Prime Minister William Bentinck, 3rd Duke of Portland, and Lady Dorothy (née Cavendish), only daughter of William Cavendish, 4th Duke of Devonshire. On the marriage the family name became Cavendish-Bentinck.

He was educated at Westminster School, a boys' public school in Westminster, London.

== Early career ==
In 1783, at the age of 9, he was given the sinecure of Clerk of the Pipe for life.

Bentinck joined the Coldstream Guards on 28 January 1791 at the age of 16, purchasing an ensign's commission. He was promoted to captain-lieutenant (lieutenant) in the 2nd Regiment of Dragoons on 4 August 1792, and to captain in the 11th Regiment of Light Dragoons on 6 April 1793. He was promoted to major in the 28th Foot on 29 March 1794 and to lieutenant-colonel in the 24th Dragoons that July. On 9 January 1798, Bentinck was promoted to colonel. In 1803 he was, to some surprise, appointed Governor of Madras, and was promoted to major-general on 1 January 1805. Although his tenure was moderately successful, it was brought to an end by the Vellore Mutiny in 1806, prompted by Bentinck's order that the native troops be forbidden to wear their traditional attire. Only after serious violence was order restored and the offending policy rescinded, and Bentinck was recalled in 1807.

After service in the Peninsular War, including as a brigade commander at the Battle of Corunna, Bentinck was appointed commander of British troops in Sicily. He was brevetted to lieutenant-general on 3 March 1811. A Whig, Bentinck used this position to meddle in internal Sicilian affairs, effecting the withdrawal from government of Ferdinand I of the Two Sicilies in favour of his son, Francis I of the Two Sicilies, the reactionary Queen's disgrace, and an attempt to devise a constitutional government for the troubled island, all of which ultimately ended in failure. As a result of his miscalculation, his Anglo-allied forces were defeated at the Battle of Ordal (1813) in Northern Spain. In 1814, Bentinck landed with British and Sicilian troops (Note: Many of the British troops were redeployed at the end of the campaign to North America. They included 'four sound units -- 1/27th, 1/44th, 1/58th, and 1/81st Foot -- derived from Bentinck's "East Coast" army which carried out independent operations in Spain and northern Italy in 1813-1814...The 1/21st and 1/62nd Foot had seen active service in the Mediterranean in 1813 when they had participated in the successful siege of Genoa, of which they formed part of the garrison when they departed for points west.') at Genoa, and commenced to make liberal proclamations of a new order in Italy which embarrassed the British government (which intended to give much of Italy to Austria), and led, once again, to his recall in 1815.

=== Bentinck in Sicily ===
As conditions in Sicily began to deteriorate at the beginning of the 19th century, England began worrying about its interests in the Mediterranean. Internal dissensions in the Sicilian government, and an ever-increasing suspicion that Queen Maria Carolina was in correspondence with the French with the French Occupation of Sicily as its object, led to the appointment of Bentinck as British representative to the Court of Palermo in July 1811. At the beginning of his time at the head of Sicilian affairs, politicians in London opposed the Bourbon rule and appealed for Sicilian annexation. Bentinck was sympathetic to the cause and plight of the Sicilians and "was quickly convinced of the need for Britain to intervene in Sicilian affairs, not so much for Britain's sake as for the well-being of the Sicilians." He was also one of the first of the dreamers to see a vision of a unified Italy.

The English, however, were content to support the Bourbons if they were willing to give the Sicilians more governmental control and a greater respect of their rights. Bentinck saw this as the perfect opportunity to insert his ideas of a Sicilian constitution. Opposition to the establishment of a constitution continued to surface, Maria Carolina proving to be one of the toughest. Her relationship with Bentinck can be summed up in the nickname that she gave him: La bestia feroce (the ferocious beast). Bentinck, however, was determined to see the establishment of a Sicilian Constitution and shortly thereafter exiled Maria Carolina from Palermo. On 18 June 1812 the Parliament assembled in Palermo and, about a month later, on 20 July 1812 the constitution was accepted and written on the basis of 15 articles, on the drafts prepared by Prince Belmonte and other Sicilian noblemen. With the establishment of the constitution the Sicilians had now gained an autonomy they had never experienced before. The constitution set up the separation of the legislative and executive powers and abolished the feudalistic practices that had been established and recognised for the past 700 years.

Bentinck's success in establishing a Sicilian constitution lasted only a few years. On 8 December 1816, a year after Ferdinand IV returned to the throne of the Kingdom of the Two Sicilies, the constitution was abolished and Sicily was reunited with Naples. The constitutional experiment was deemed a failure although it cannot be said to be his alone. The Sicilian nobles were inexperienced and in the face of the difficulties of 1814 and 1815 could not sustain a constitution without British support, which was withdrawn in the wake of the end of the Napoleonic Wars. The British no longer had an invested interest in the internal affairs of Sicily now that the threat of French invasion had been removed. The establishment of a Sicilian constitution that was facilitated by Bentinck was not to be soon forgotten. The ideas found therein and the small taste of freedom lingered in the memories of the Sicilians and had an influence on the desire for autonomy that was at the base of the Sicilian revolutions of 1820 and 1848.

=== Italian adventure ===
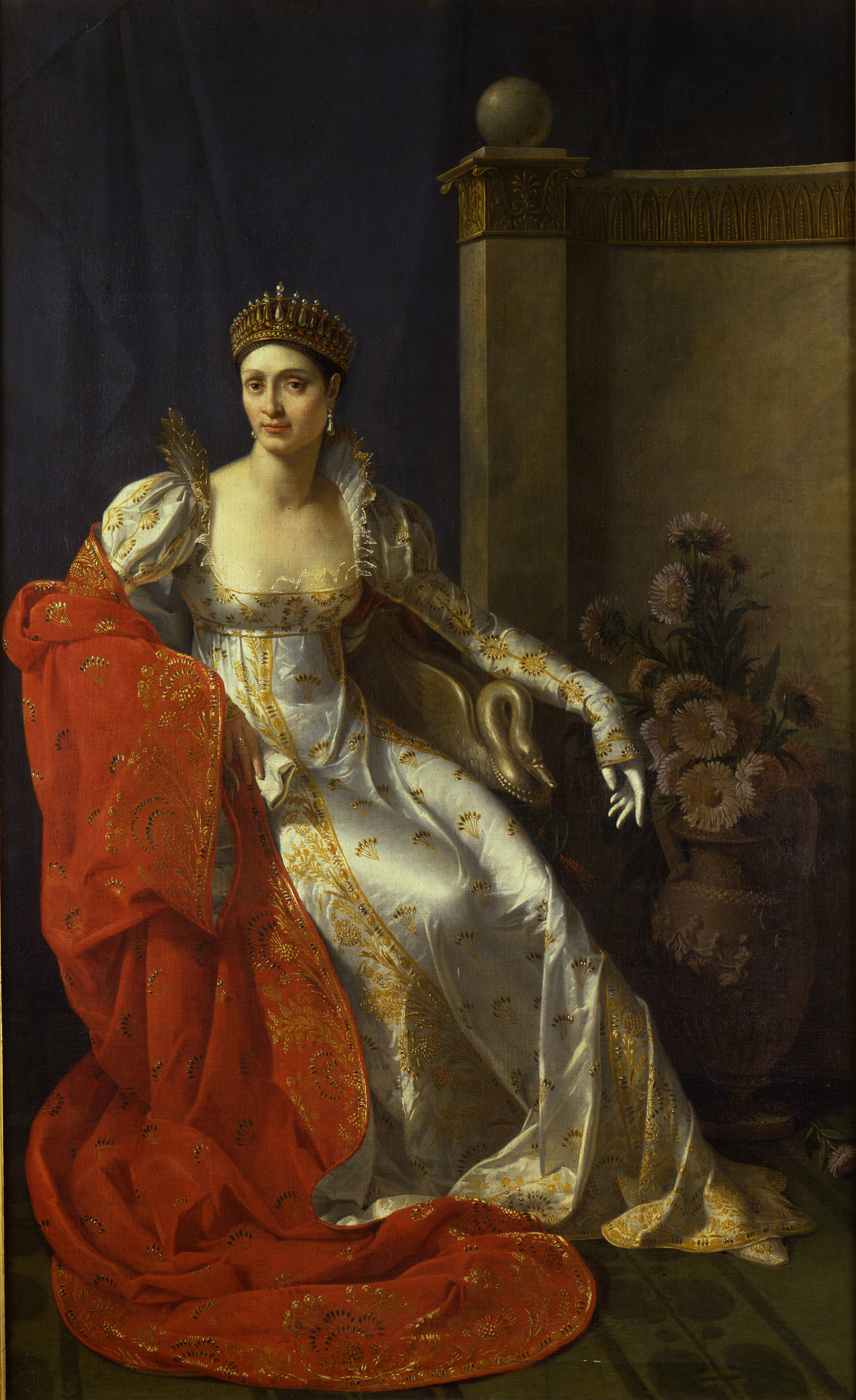
Elisa Bonaparte; whom Bentinck would not countenance retaining the Principality of Lucca and Piombino, first granted to her by Napoleon in 1805.

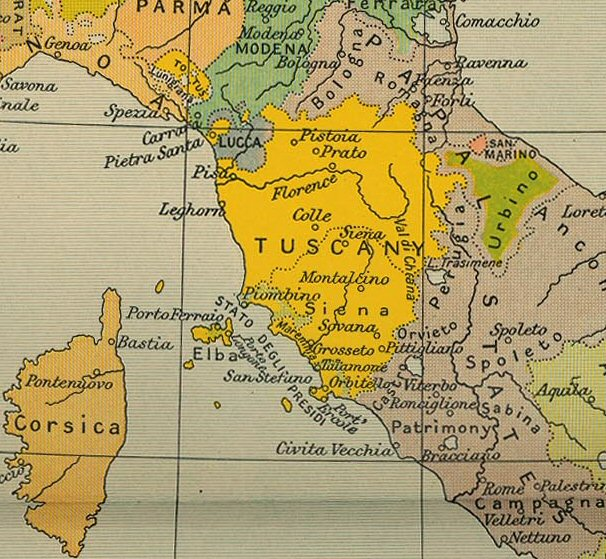
Territory of the Grand Duchy of Tuscany in 1796

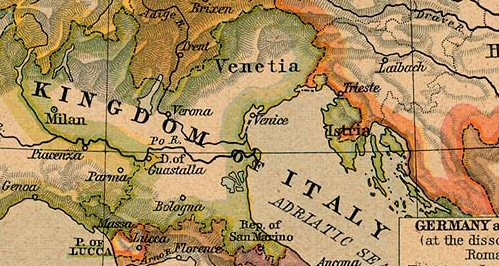
Northern Italy in 1814

Sailing from Sicily on 30 January 1814, Bentinck first made for Naples. There he reluctantly signed an armistice with Joachim Murat, whom he personally detested as being a man whose "whole life had been a crime", yet whom Britain found it expedient to detach from his brother-in-law, Napoleon, by guaranteeing his Kingdom of Naples in return for an alliance. Having instructed the forces under his command in Sicily to make a landing at Livorno, Bentinck then travelled north, with a day's stop in Rome, to join them. The disembarkation at Livorno began on 9 March and took three days to complete, Murat's Neapolitans already having occupied the port beforehand.

Murat, who had just joined the Sixth Coalition, was married to Napoleon's sister Caroline. Another sister, Elisa, though having now abandoned her Grand Duchy of Tuscany, had nevertheless not given up completely in attempting to salvage something from the collapse of Napoleon's Empire; she had obtained from Murat the guarantee that he would obtain the consent of the Coalition to her retaining the Principality of Lucca and Piombino in return for having rendered up Tuscany without a fight. Elisa had, by the time of Bentinck's appearance at Livorno, retired to Lucca. Upon hearing of his landing, she sent a delegation to gain assurances that Murat's pact would be respected. Bentinck replied that it would not, and that if she did not depart immediately, she would be arrested. With 2,000 British troops dispatched towards the city to carry out this threat, the heavily pregnant Elisa had no choice but to abandon the last of her territories and flee north, where she eventually fell into Allied hands at Bologna.

Elisa quit Lucca on 13 March. The next day, Bentinck issued a proclamation from Livorno calling on the Italian nation to rise in a movement of liberation. "Italians!" he declared, "Great Britain has landed her troops on your shores; she holds out her hand to you to free you from the iron yoke of Buonaparte...hesitate no longer...assert your rights and your liberty. Call us, and we will hasten to you, and then, our forces joined, will effect that Italy may become what in the best times she was". In thus attempting to bring about his long-nurtured dream of an independent Italian nation-state in the north and centre (he did not consider the Neapolitans and Sicilians 'Italians'), Bentinck was quite publicly repudiating the policy of his own Government - which was intending to largely restore the status quo ante bellum in Italy; with Austria in possession of Lombardy and the King of Sardinia re-established in Piedmont. For the next month, Bentinck was therefore operating as effectively an independent actor representative of Britain only, as Rosselli says, in the widest sense: in that he held himself to be furthering Britain's true interests, regardless of whether the current Government recognised them or not.

Ordering his troops north to besiege Genoa, Bentinck himself now headed to Reggio Emilia for a conference with Murat. At this conference on the 15th, he brazenly demanded that Tuscany be handed over to himself and evacuated by the Neapolitan forces then in possession of it. It was necessary, he argued, that Tuscany be under British jurisdiction, for if not he would have no logistical base from which to conduct future operations – to which Murat replied that it was the same argument on his team which dictated his own necessary possession of it. Bentinck suddenly threatened to turn his forces against Naples itself and restore the rightful Ferdinand IV if Murat did not give way, but was quickly reprimanded in a firm note from Castlereagh reminding him that he was instructed to co-operate in every way with Murat and Austria – at which he reluctantly withdrew his bid for Tuscany (which he had likely been hoping to turn into the nucleus of a free Italian state under his own aegis) and left for Genoa. There had, in any case, been no discernible response from the Tuscans to Bentinck's proclamation, while in Genoa he would find a welcoming audience at last.

Bentinck had been ordered to take and occupy Genoa in the name of the King of Sardinia. But when the city surrendered to him on 18 April 1814, he instead proclaimed – contrary to the intentions of the Coalition – the restoration of the Republic of Genoa and the repeal of all laws passed since 1797, much to the enthusiasm of the Genoese. At the same time, he dispatched an expeditionary force to Corsica to attempt to revive the Anglo-Corsican Kingdom of 1794–1796 and gain for Britain another useful base in the Mediterranean. In Genoa meanwhile, on 24 April, he received representations from the provisional government in Milan beseeching Britain's support for the maintenance of an independent Kingdom of Italy rather than the restoration of Austria's rule over Lombardy. With Napoleon's abdication of both the French and Italian thrones on 11 April, the government in Milan was in search of a new sovereign who would better bolster its chances of survival. In seeking to bind Britain to its cause, the suggestion was put to Bentinck that Prince Adolphus, Duke of Cambridge, the seventh son of George III, would be a welcome candidate; though Bentinck recommended they might look to Archduke Francis of Este as a more realistic candidate, in order to mollify Austria.

With Napoleon's double abdication on 11 April however - though the news took time to cross the Alps - Bentinck's capacity to influence events on the ground while, with the war against the Emperor still raging, all was still to a great extent up in the air, largely came to an end. As did his government's motive for toleration. His erratic behaviour over the recent months had led the Prime Minister, Lord Liverpool, to brand him simply "mad", and his scope of authority was sharply reduced; though he was not finally dismissed from his grand post as Commander-in-Chief in the Mediterranean until April the following year.

== Last governor-general of Bengal ==
Lord William Bentinck was the first governor general of British-occupied India. Everyone else before him was the governor of Bengal (Fort William). On his return to England, Bentinck served in the House of Commons for some years before being appointed governor-general of Bengal in 1828. His principal concern was to turn around the loss-making East India Company, to ensure that its charter would be renewed by the British government.

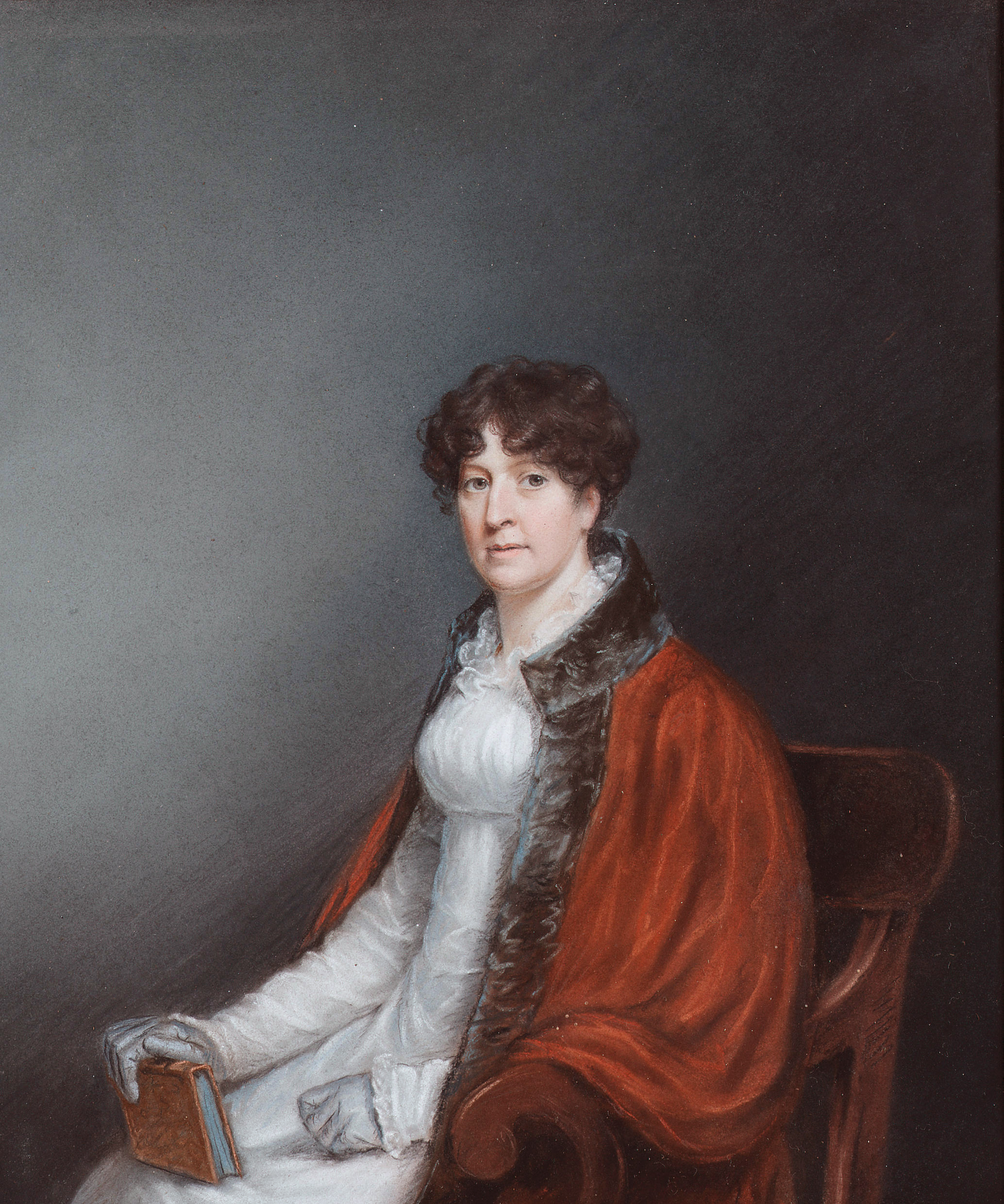
Lady William Cavendish-Bentinck (c 1783–1843) (Ellen Sharples)

Bentinck engaged in an extensive range of cost-cutting measures, earning the lasting enmity of many military men whose wages were cut. Although historians emphasise his more efficient financial management, his modernising projects also included a policy of westernisation, influenced by the Utilitarianism of Jeremy Bentham and James Mill, which was more controversial. He also reformed the court system.

== Educational reforms ==
Bentinck made English the medium of instruction after passing the English Education Act 1835. English replaced Persian as the language of the higher courts. He founded the Calcutta Medical College after the committee appointed by him found that "The Native Medical Institution established in 1822, The Committee headed by Dr John Grant as president and J C C Sutherland, C E Trevelyan, Thomas Spens, Ram Comul Sen and M J Bramley as members found the education, examination system, training and lack of practical anatomy clearly below standards" and recommended its closure, which Bentinck accepted and he opened the Calcutta Medical College which offered western medical education and opening of this college is seen as Introduction of Western science into India. It was the first western medical college in Asia and it was open to all without discrimination of caste or creed. James Ranald Martin compares the foundation of this college to Bentinck's other acclaimed act of abolishing sati.

== Social reforms ==
=== Abolition of Sati ===
Bentinck decided to put an immediate end to sati practice after careful enquiry within a year of his arrival in Calcutta. Horace Hayman Wilson and Raja Ram Mohan Roy cautioned Bentinck against abruptly ending the practice and suggested that the practice might be gradually stopped by increasing checks. After observing that the judges in the courts were unanimously in favour of the ban, Bentinck proceeded to lay the draft before his council. Charles Metcalfe, the Governor's most prominent counselor, expressed apprehension that the banning of sati might be "used by the disaffected and designing" as "an engine to produce insurrection." However, these concerns did not deter him from upholding the Governor's decision "in the suppression of the horrible custom by which so many lives are cruelly sacrificed."

Thus on Sunday morning of 4 December 1829 Lord Bentinck issued Regulation XVII declaring sati to be illegal and punishable in criminal courts. It was presented to William Carey for translation. His response is recorded as follows: "Springing to his feet and throwing off his black coat he cried, 'No church for me to-day... If I delay an hour to translate and publish this, many a widow's life may be sacrificed,' he said. By evening the task was finished."

On 2 February 1830 this law was extended to Madras and Bombay. The ban was challenged by a petition signed by "several thousand persons, being zamindars, principal and other Hindoo inhabitants of Bengal, Bihar, Orissa etc." and the matter went to the Privy Council in London. Along with British supporters, Ram Mohan Roy presented counter-petitions to parliament in support of ending sati. The Privy Council rejected the petition in 1832, and the ban on sati was upheld.

=== Ban on female infanticide and human sacrifice ===
Bentinck prohibited female infanticide and the custom of certain newly born girls to be killed and against human sacrifices. Although his reforms met little resistance among native Indians at the time, Indian enemies repeated a story to the effect that he had once planned to demolish the Taj Mahal and sell off the marble. According to Bentinck's biographer John Rosselli, the story arose from Bentinck's fund-raising sale of discarded marble from Agra Fort and of the metal from the Great Agra Gun, the largest cannon ever cast, a historical artifact that dated to the reign of Akbar the Great. Bentinck removed flogging as a punishment in the Indian Army.

== Saint Helena Act 1833 ==
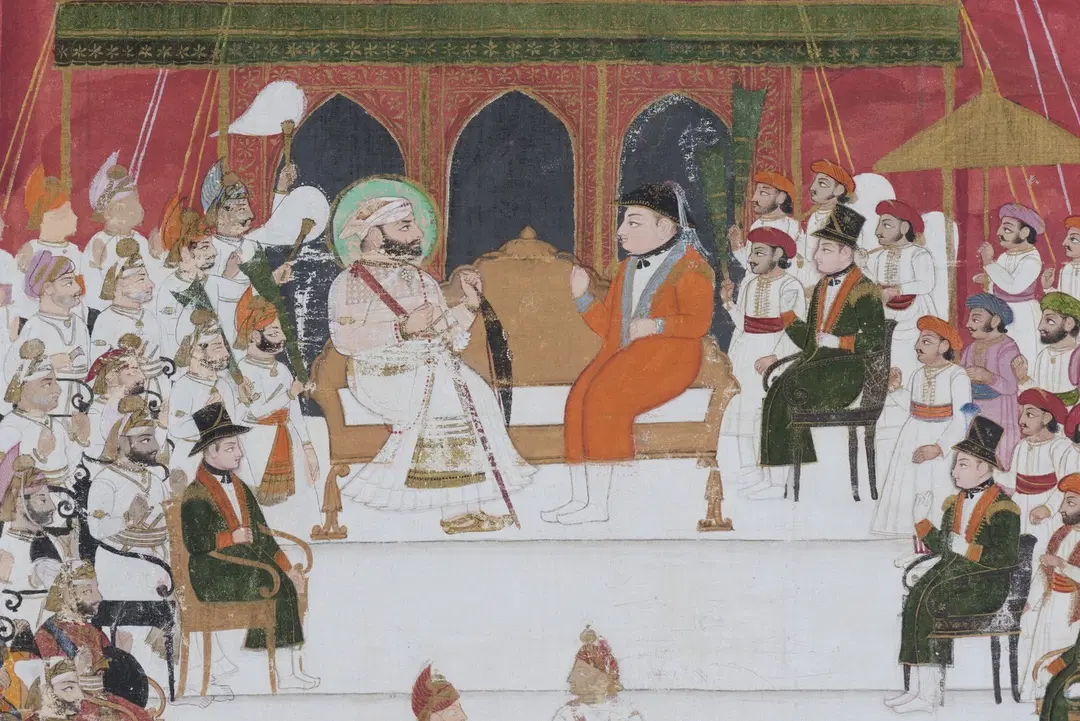
Maharana Jawan Singh of Mewar Receiving the Governor General of India, Lord William Cavendish Bentinck, February 8th, 1832

The Saint Helena Act 1833, also called the Charter Act 1833, was passed during Bentinck's tenure and, accordingly, the monopoly of the East India Company in China was abolished, while in India it was extended for a further twenty years. The Governor-General of Bengal became the Governor-General of India. This act added a law member to the executive council of the governor general. Bishops of Bombay, Madras, and Calcutta were to be appointed for the benefit of the Christians in India.

Bentinck returned to the UK in 1835 and refused a peerage, partly because he had no children and partly because he wanted to stand for Parliament again. He again entered the House of Commons as a Member for Glasgow.

== Personal life, death and legacy ==
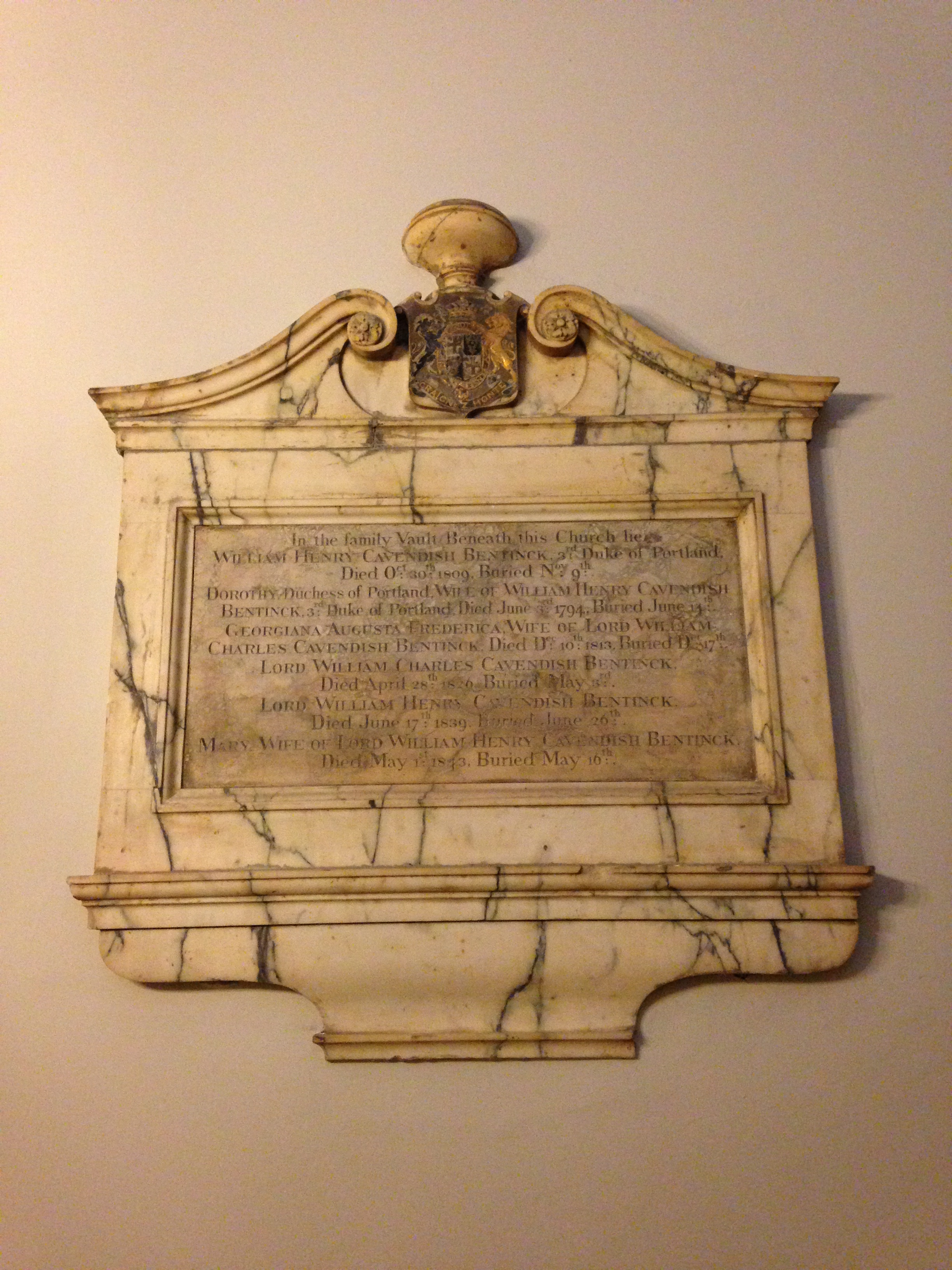
Memorial at the Bentinck family vault in St Marylebone Parish Church, London

In August 1791, Bentinck played in a minor match for Marylebone Cricket Club against Nottingham Cricket Club at King's Meadow, Nottingham.

Bentinck married Lady Mary, daughter of Arthur Acheson, 1st Earl of Gosford, on 18 February 1803. The marriage was childless. She was a watercolourist, and her album of 61 paintings of the birds of the Himalaya Mountains, circa 1833, is held at the Natural History Museum, London. He died in Paris on 17 June 1839, aged 64. Mary died in May 1843. They are buried together in the Bentinck family vault in St Marylebone Parish Church, London.

Explorer Matthew Flinders, who in 1802 charted the South Wellesley Islands in the Gulf of Carpentaria, Australia (now part of the state of Queensland), assigned the name Bentinck Island in honour of Lord Bentinck, and the island group (Wellesley) and the largest island (Mornington Island) in honour of Richard Wellesley, 2nd Earl of Mornington. In 1803, the two men had acted as interceded on Flinders' behalf to persuade the French to release Flinders after he had been imprisoned by them on Mauritius.

== Notes ==
Parliament of Great Britain
Preceded by James Macpherson; William Smith	Member of Parliament for Camelford; 1796–1796; With: William Smith	Succeeded by William Joseph Denison; John Angerstein
Preceded by Lord Edward Bentinck; Charles Pierrepont	Member of Parliament for Nottinghamshire; 1796–1800; With: Evelyn Pierrepont	Succeeded by Parliament of the United Kingdom
Parliament of the United Kingdom
Preceded by Parliament of Great Britain	Member of Parliament for Nottinghamshire; 1801–1803; With: Evelyn Pierrepont 1801; Lord Pierrepont 1801–1803	Succeeded by Lord Pierrepont; Anthony Hardolph Eyre
Preceded by Viscount Newark; Anthony Hardolph Eyre	Member of Parliament for Nottinghamshire; 1812–1814; With: Viscount Newark	Succeeded by Viscount Newark; Frank Sotheron
Preceded by Viscount Newark; Frank Sotheron	Member of Parliament for Nottinghamshire; 1816–1826; With: Frank Sotheron	Succeeded by Frank Sotheron; John Lumley
Preceded by John Walpole; Lord John Bentinck	Member of Parliament for King's Lynn; 1826–1828; With: John Walpole	Succeeded by John Walpole; Lord George Bentinck
Preceded by James Oswald; Colin Dunlop	Member of Parliament for Glasgow; 1836–1839; With: James Oswald 1836–1837; John Dennistoun 1837–1839	Succeeded by John Dennistoun; James Oswald
Government offices
Preceded by William Butterworth Bayley (acting)	Governor-General of India; 1828–1835	Succeeded by Sir Charles Metcalfe (acting)
Military offices
Preceded by The Lord Heathfield	Colonel of the 20th Regiment of (Light) Dragoons; 1810–1813	Succeeded by Sir Stapleton Cotton
Preceded by The Marquess of Lothian	Colonel of the 11th Regiment of (Light) Dragoons; 1813–1839	Succeeded by Lord Charles Manners
Preceded by Sir Edward Barnes	Commander-in-Chief, India; 1833–1835	Succeeded by Sir James Watson
