= Spaldington =

Village and civil parish in the East Riding of Yorkshire, England

Coordinates: 53.7931°N 0.8451°W

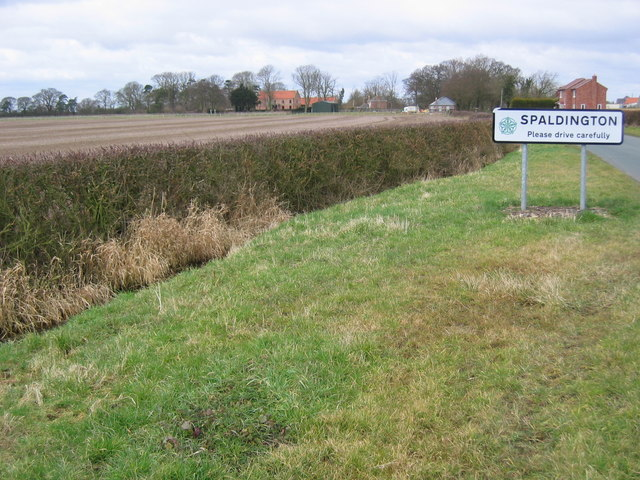

- Location within the East Riding of Yorkshire
- Population: 185 (2011 Census)
- OS grid reference: SE761335
  - London: 160 mi (260 km) SSE
- Civil parish: Spaldington
- Unitary authority: East Riding of Yorkshire
- Ceremonial county: East Riding of Yorkshire
- Region: Yorkshire and the Humber
- Country: England
- Sovereign state: United Kingdom
- Post town: GOOLE
- Postcode district: DN14
- Dialling code: 01430
- Police: Humberside
- Fire: Humberside
- Ambulance: Yorkshire
- UK Parliament: Goole and Pocklington

Spaldington is a village and civil parish in the East Riding of Yorkshire, England, lying approximately 3 miles (5 km) north from the market town of Howden and 14 miles (23 km) south of York. It lies to the west of the A614 road.

== Geography ==
The civil parish lies in the Vale of York east of the River Derwent approximately halfway between Howden and Holme on Spalding Moor. The land is predominately agricultural in use with the exception of Boothferry Golf Club. The land is at an altitude of around 5 metres (16 ft) above sea level. The village of Spaldington is the only significant place of habitation in the parish, excluding farms.

Spaldington lies within the Parliamentary constituency of Goole and Pocklington.

According to the 2011 UK Census, Spaldington parish had a population of 185, an increase on the 2001 UK census figure of 171.

== History ==
The name is recorded in the Domesday Book in 1086 as Spellinton. The name may refer to a river named Spalding, derived from the Old English spald "ditch or fenland river", which also gave its name to Spalding Moor. The River Spalding is not recorded, but would be the river now known as the River Foulness. The name may also be derived from the tribe known as the Spalda mentioned in the 7th century Tribal Hidage, which gave rise to the tribe or district known as the Spaldingas, the "dwellers by the Spald". If that explanation is correct, Spald could refer to some other fenland river or rivers. The Spaldingas also gave their name to the town of Spalding in Lincolnshire.

Spaldington (Spellinton) was listed as being in the manor of Wressle (Weresa) in the Domesday Book of 1086.

In around 1200 Eustace de Vesci and William Fitzpeter were joint lords of the manor; after de Vesci's death the manorship passed to Fitzpeter, then to his sister, to her eldest daughter who had married Peter dela Haye, then to the Vasavour's by the marriage of Isabella de la Haye to John Vavasour, father of John Vavasour died 1506.

Spaldington Hall, an Elizabethan building was a seat of the Vavasour family. In 1838 the Hall was demolished. By 1850 'Hall farm' (or 'Old Hall farm') had been built on top of it.

A church or chapel dating to as early as 1650 was still extant in 1850, but had been demolished by 1890. A Wesleyan chapel, also used as school, was built in the village in 1820. By the 1830s the population (of the township) was 361.

Spaldington mill, a corn mill on the Spaldington to Willitoft road was extant in 1850, but had been demolished by 1890 leaving the mill house; in the 20th century the mill house was removed, and the site levelled and field boundaries removed by the 1970s.

The airship station RNAS Howden was built in the southern part of the parish in the early 20th century, opening in 1916, and closing in 1930.

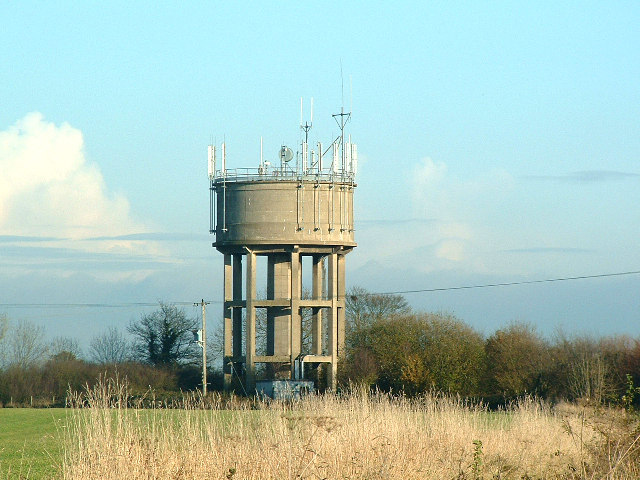
Spaldington water tower with telecommunication aerials (2005)

In 1953 F. Hall & Sons constructed a water tower for Howden Rural District Council at the A614 / Spaldington Lane junction.

=== Wind farms ===
In 2009, two planning applications were submitted for wind farms.

Volkswind applied to build seven 2.3 MW turbines on Spaldington Common east of Spaldington; the application was refused in September 2010, the company appealed the decision, and the appeal was rejected in 2011.

Falck Renewables and Coriolis Energy submitted an application for five 2.3 MW wind turbines, 126 metres (413 ft) tip height with 92 metres (302 ft) diameter blades, to be built west of the village on Spaldington Airfield; Spaldington parish council and a large number of residents objected to the scheme; the application was refused in September 2010, but allowed on appeal (under the Town and Country Planning Act 1990) in 2011 (appeal reference APP/E2001/A/10/2137617). Falck Renewables expected construction to begin in 2013, with the wind farm operational by late 2014.

In 2012 an application was submitted by RWE npower renewables for a third wind farm (River Valley Wind Farm) of six 2–3 MW wind turbines between Welham Bridge and Gribthorpe partly within the northern boundary of the parish. The application was refused in August 2013, and the developer submitted an appeal.
