= Hasholme Logboat =

Iron Age boat (750–390 BC)

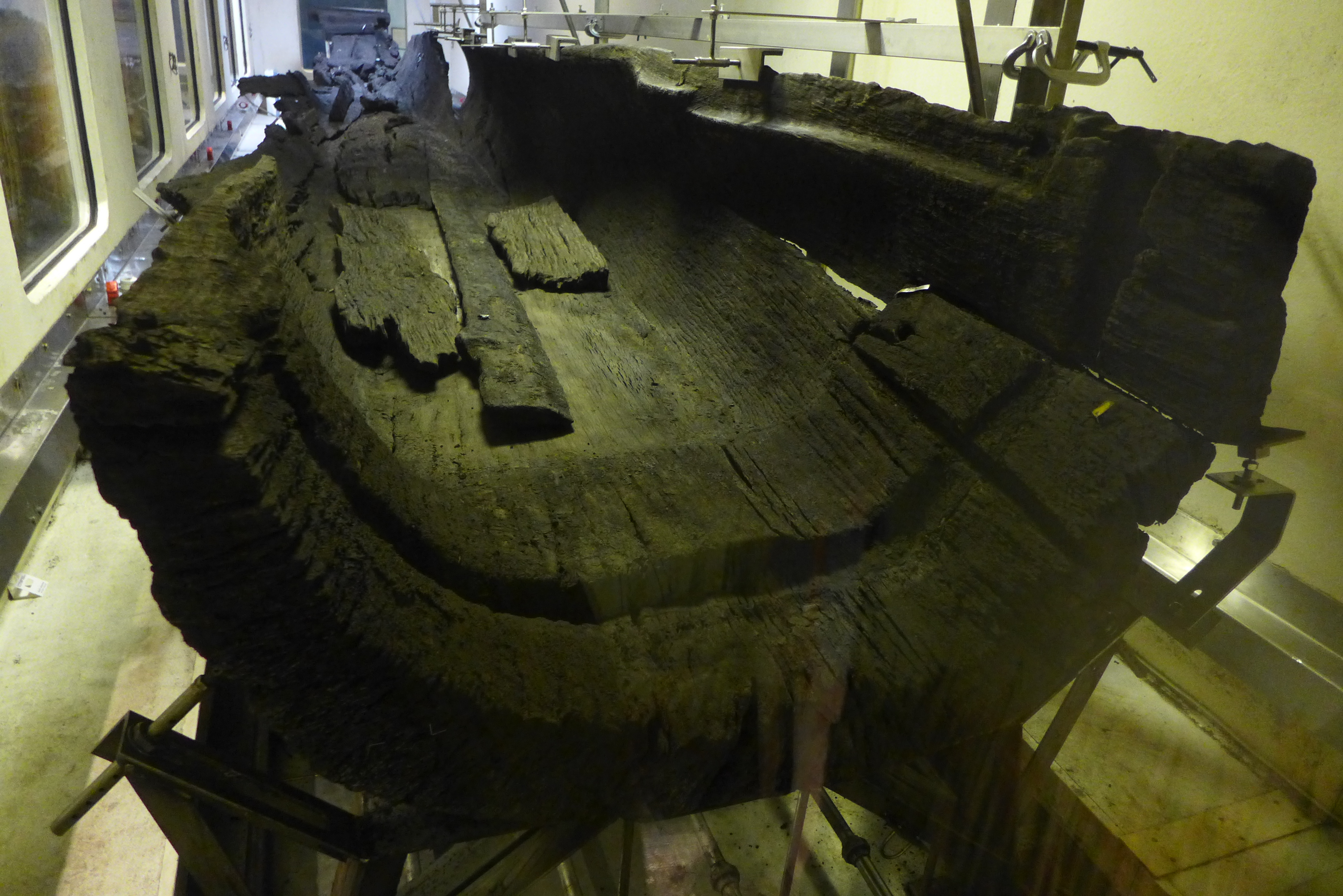
- Hasholme Logboat

History
- Completed: c. 300 BC
- Status: Museum ship

General characteristics
- Type: Oak logboat
- Length: 12.87 m (42 ft 3 in) o/a
- Beam: 1.4 m (4 ft 7 in)
- Depth: 1.25 m (4 ft 1 in)
- Capacity: up to 9,000 kg (20,000 lb) cargo
- Crew: up to 20

Hasholme logboat is an Iron Age boat (c. 300 BC) discovered at Hasholme, an area of civil parish of Holme-on-Spalding-Moor in the East Riding of the English county of Yorkshire. It is now on display in the Hull and East Riding Museum, in Hull.

The boat was located and excavated at Hasholme, on the north bank of the River Foulness in the broad river channel. The boat was situated in mostly waterlogged clay (silty-clay, silt and sand) deposits, which greatly helped the preservation of the timbers. Apart from the boat itself, the excavations did not produce any major associated artifacts, with the exception of a single pottery shard. For dating purposes two techniques, tree-ring dating and radiocarbon ^{14}C/thermoluminescence, were employed. Both methods gave rather comparable results of some time for the timber between 750 and 390, which places the construction of the logboat at the end of the 4th century BC. Based on reconstruction of the landscape around the site, it is known that it was dominated by mixed oak, birch and alder woodland, with some meadows and marshes, as well as many river tributaries and oxbow lakes.

== Size ==
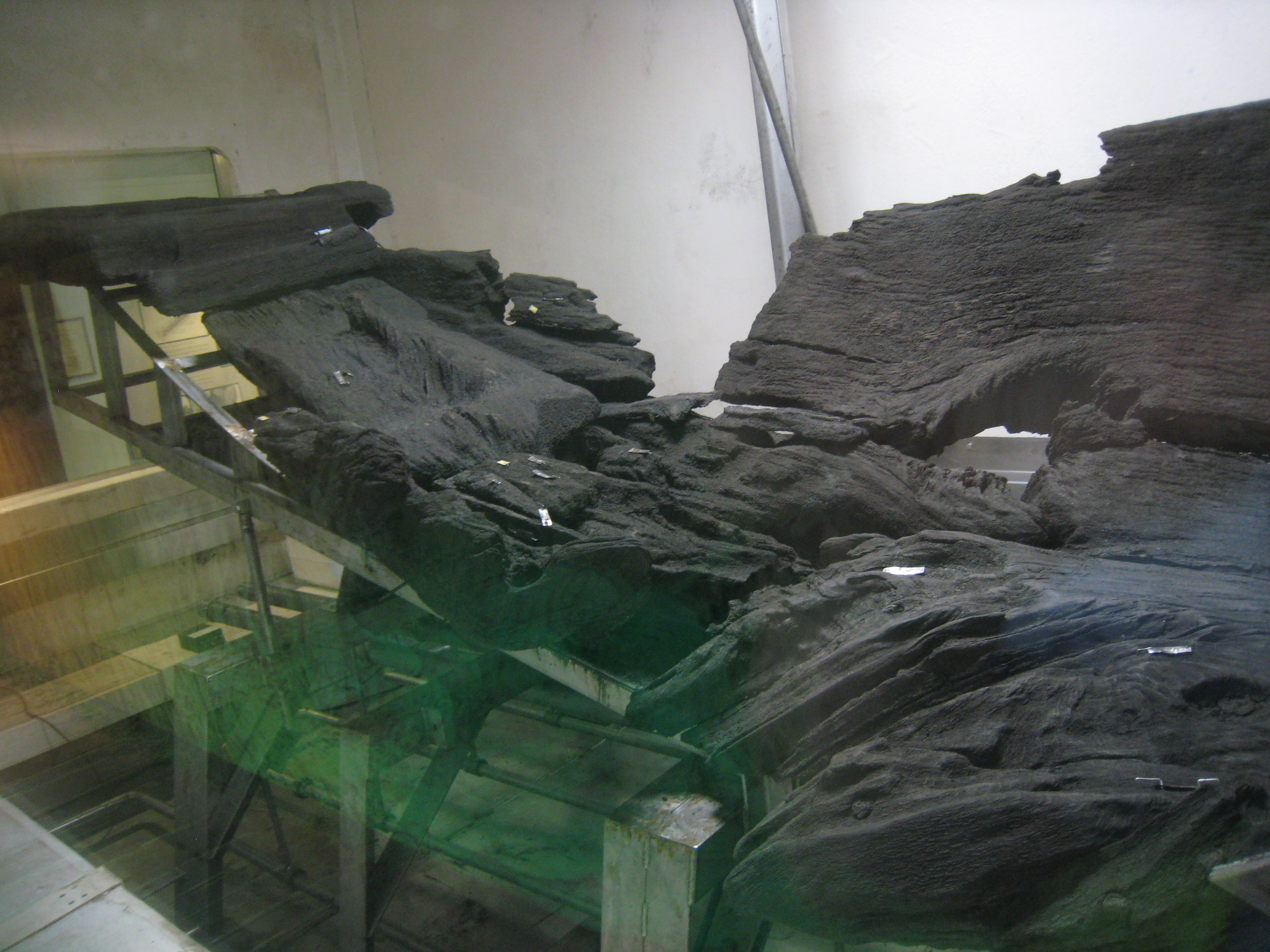
Side view

The University of Hull described it in 2010 as the largest surviving logboat in the UK.

== "Parent log" of the boat's hull ==
The hull of the Hasholme logboat was made out of an oak tree (Quercus sp.). After all the measurements of the hull were taken, it was estimated that the parent log (oak log the boat was made of) had to be approximately 14 metres (46 ft) long with at least 5.4 m (18 ft) circumference. Thus the theoretical weight of this log must have been around 28.5 tons but because of the presence of "heart rot" (the natural process of rotting of the interior of the log) these estimates are exaggerated. Based on the size of the oak and other dendro measurements, it was suggested that this kind of tree was between 810 and 880 years old on felling. Oaks of such advanced age and size must have developed a rot known as "brittle heart", which originates at the base and spreads upward. In the case of Hasholme, this rot spread almost to the very top of the trunk. This meant that even though the hollowing was much easier, the openings on both ends had to be closed and made watertight. It was no accident to select a tree with an extensive rot along its entire length and thus save a tremendous amount of time.

== Shape ==
The Hasholme boat is made of one whole log and is generally log-shaped. It has a flat bottom outboard and also inboard. With the bottom horizontal, the top edge of the sheer line generally slopes down towards the bow. However, when the boat is afloat the sheer line becomes horizontal and the bottom gradually slopes upward. Near the bow, the bottom becomes even more rounded and distinctly angled. At the stern, the thickness of the bottom gradually increases to provide sufficient timber to support a transom. The forward upper edges on both sides of the hull are curved in sections and rebates to support extensions in the form of a washstrake. The overall length of the Hasholme logboat is 12.87 m (42.2 ft), 1.4 m (4.6 ft) in maximum beam, and 1.25 metres (4.1 ft) in maximum height.

== Bow ==
The bow section of the Hasholme logboat has a most original design. It is made of two parts, lower and upper bow timbers, which together formed a front enclosure to the log. The lower bow piece is 60 cm (24 in) long and 2 cm (0.79 in) thick. On both sides of this timber there are symmetrical rebates which match similar rebates on the main hull as well as series of cleats with transverse holes through which the second and third transverse timbers passed. Those transverse timbers, three in total, not only fasten the lower bow timber to both sides of the hull, but also strengthened and linked the bow section. Forward of the groove for the foremost timber, there were three large vertical holes. The upper bow piece is also around 60 cm long and has a rather complex shape. The bottom section of the upper bow timber has a transverse lip to envelope the leading edge of the lower bow timber, and a series of longitudinal grooves on both sides to fit over the forward ends of the washstrakes of the upper part of the hull. This upper timber was fastened to the lower timber by three vertical tree-nails through corresponding holes in the lower bow. Those tree-nails were approximately 35 cm (14 in) long and 0.6 cm (¼ in) thick.

== Stern ==
In general, the stern is at the right angle to the rest of the boat. Approximately 25 cm (9.8 in) forward of the stern, a transverse groove was cut into the bottom and sides to support the transom piece. Forward of the transom several grooves were cut to support transverse shelves, with the most aft shelf covering the transom. Such fitted transoms, which enclose the end of the log, were relatively common in prehistoric logboats. In the case of the Hasholme boat, the rotted heart prevented the construction of an integrated bow and stern, therefore both sections had to be precisely fitted and watertight. The transom itself is 1 m high and 1.08 m in breadth, with rounded lower profile and upper corners cut away. The thickness varies from 25 mm to 90 mm. At the top portion of the transom there are two horizontal holes without any visible wear. Since the original transom weighed between 60 and 75 kg (132 and 165 lb) those holes were necessary to place it inside the grooves. Those grooves were later caulked with some mixture of mosses and twigs to make the whole structure watertight. The upper corner of the starboard was cut away and a long tree-nail driven through both sides of the hull. tightening the transom in place. The second function of this tree-nail was to form a tie between both sides of the hull, with similar beam-ties in the bow section of the boat. Fitted transoms are relatively common in pre-historic logboats since it is much easier to construct a transom and make it watertight than to hollow an entire healthy log.

== Beam-ties ==
Beam-ties are transverse timbers fitted athwartship near the stern and their function was to tie the two sides of the hull together. This becomes especially important for logboats without integral ends: that is, with fitted transom and bow. At the bow section, transverse timbers were fitted and these also functioned as beam-ties.

== Thickness gauges ==
At seven points along the length of the boat, thickness gauges were cut, usually at the bottom of the boat. Those holes were bored from outside the log after the outside of the boat was formed. The depth of the holes equated to the required thickness of the boat bottom. In the Hasholme logboat, however, the thickness gauges were bored not at the bottom but at the turn of the bilge, and later corked by oak tree-nails.

== Holes near the sheer ==
There are eleven pairs of equally spaced holes (60 mm in diameter) near the top edge of the sheer line. Close analysis of those holes showed no signs of any intensive wear or fitting marks inside them so their purpose is still a mystery. Possible functions of the holes:

- Expansion of the hull: unlikely with Hasholme because it was made of thick oak, which does not expand. The thickness of the sides would not allow expansion.
- Holes for lashings during the construction phase.
- Cross-beams / ribs: also discounted because there is no evidence of any pressure or attachment, nor the need for any.
- Carrying-handles: poles could have been passed through those eleven pairs of holes to carry the boat. However, the great weight of the boat would require some 44 people. Nobody knows either if such thin poles would support the weight.
- Fastening holes for hides: Holes could be used as some sort of fastening points for hides to keep cargo or crew dry during longer expeditions.

== Washstrakes ==
Both sides of the front-upper hull consisted of washstrakes fastened to the hull by a series of tree-nails and rebate grooves. Given the limitations of the log, the washstrakes were probably fitted to the hull to increase the height of the sides near the bow section. They were directly attached to both sides of the hull and fitted inside special grooves in the upper bow timber.

== Repairs ==
It appears that there was a repair done on the portside hull. To patch it, a larger portion of the hull was worked away and a rebate was cut around the edges. Then, a repair patch, some 1.25 m long, was manufactured with similar rebates so both parts would perfectly match. In both parts, the corresponding holes were cut and tree-nails used to fasten them from outside. The other repair, which was done to the starboard inner face of the hull at the stern, was patched by an insertion of a pre-shaped block and fastened by a tree-nail. Based on the analysis of the hull, this repair was initiated as a split stopper. Boring a hole at one end of a split is a recognised way of minimising a possibility of its spreading. The split was therefore caulked, a section of wood around the transom removed, and the repair block inserted and the transom finished.

== Design and build ==
Based on ethnographic evidence, it is assumed that this kind of log could be cut by the use of some primitive stone or iron tools, but mostly by the use of controlled fire. After the log was cut, it was moved on wooden rollers to the construction site. From there, work generally had to start from the bottom of the hull and followed by shaping the hull sides.

A major requirement while working with such an enormous log must have been to minimise the number of times the log had to be turned over. The first stage would be to externally flatten the bottom and slightly upturn the bow and stern and shape the hull sides, as well as drilling holes for thickness gauges as required. The log would then be rolled over and placed on some sort of timber framework so that access to the bottom was still possible. The next stage would be to work the upper section of the log to produce a sheer line and then work the inside until thickness gauges were reached. In this case, because of the presence of extensive rot, hollowing was probably done by tools rather than by fire. The thickness of the sides would be achieved by eye or by sound, simply by tapping the log. For the bottom, however, the holes left by the thickness gauges were later plugged by tightly fitted and dried oak tree-nails to ensure they were completely watertight upon expansion of the timber. The log would then be finished internally, with all the rebates for fitting bow timbers, transom, washstrakes, and holes along the sheer-line cut. As the final step, bow and stern timbers, which were separate pieces from the hull log, would be caulked with moss and the whole structure made watertight.

For many measurements, natural units, such as thumb, palm and foot, appear to have been used. For example, the thickness gauges were approximately one thumb in diameter, and the holes near the sheer approximately two thumbs.

The overall time to build the Hasholme logboat would directly depend on the number of people involved. Based on other ethnographic evidence it has been estimated that the total time taken would have been roughly one month. Even though building a logboat was always a communal effort, the complexity of the bow and stern sections suggest that a master boat builder with specialised knowledge must have been employed in this case.

There is no evidence to suggest that this boat has ever been fitted with a mast or sail of any kind. The major means of propulsion were either paddles or long poles, while steering was likely to have been done by an oar. Judging from the size of the boat, there were probably nine pairs of paddlers, 18 in total, and two steersmen. Paddlers would most likely paddle from a standing position, while steersmen would stand on the stern platform. With this arrangement, an important function of the boat would have been to demonstrate the power and high status of the group to their neighbours. Another function of the boat might have been simply to transport cargoes such as iron ore, rocks, timber, grain or meat, among others, with a maximum load as high as 9,000 kilograms (20,000 lb). In this case, the arrangement and number of paddlers may have been adjusted to take account of the cargo carried.

== See also ==
- Hanson Log Boat – a comparable Bronze Age boat
- Poole Logboat
- List of surviving ancient ships
