= Tollingham =

Hamlet in the East Riding of Yorkshire, England

Coordinates: 53.810569°N 0.736582°W

- Location within the East Riding of Yorkshire
- OS grid reference: SE832356
- Civil parish: Holme-on-Spalding-Moor
- Unitary authority: East Riding of Yorkshire
- Ceremonial county: East Riding of Yorkshire
- Region: Yorkshire and the Humber
- Country: England
- Sovereign state: United Kingdom
- Post town: YORK
- Postcode district: YO43
- Dialling code: 01430
- Police: Humberside
- Fire: Humberside
- Ambulance: Yorkshire
- UK Parliament: Goole and Pocklington

Tollingham is a hamlet in the East Riding of Yorkshire, England. It is situated approximately 2 miles (3.2 km) south-east of the village of Holme-on-Spalding-Moor and 7 miles (11 km) north-east of the market town of Howden. It lies to the west of the Market Weighton Canal.

It forms part of the civil parish of Holme-on-Spalding-Moor.

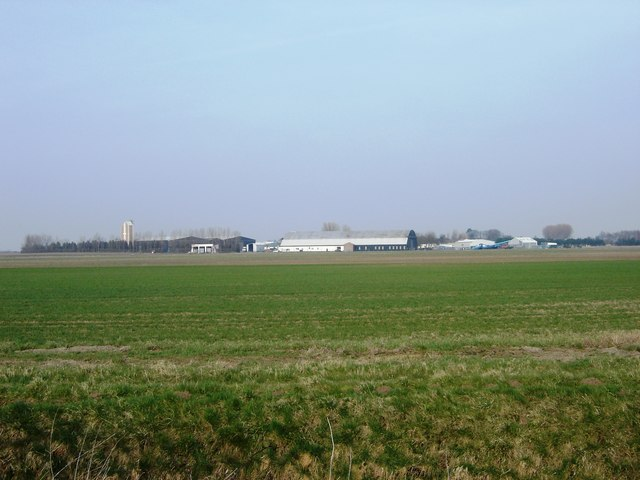
Tollingham Industrial Estate
