= Spalding Moor =

Moor in the East Riding of Yorkshire, England

Coordinates: 53.81°N 0.83°W

Spalding Moor is a moor (in the sense of an area of low lying wetland) in the East Riding of Yorkshire in England. It lies between the River Derwent and the town of Market Weighton at the edge of the Yorkshire Wolds. It forms part of the Humberhead Levels, south and east of the Escrick glacial moraine at the southern edge of the Vale of York.

The name is recorded in 1172 as Spaldinghemore. The name may refer to a river named Spalding, derived from the Old English spald "ditch or fenland river", which also gave its name to the village of Spaldington. The River Spalding is not recorded, but would be the river now known as the River Foulness. The name may also be derived from the tribe known as the Spalda mentioned in the 7th century Tribal Hidage, which gave rise to the tribe or district known as the Spaldingas, the "dwellers by the Spald". If that explanation is correct, Spald could refer to some other fenland river or rivers. The Spaldingas also gave their name to the town of Spalding in Lincolnshire.

As the moor was drained and cultivated, the name fell out of general use, but lives on in the name of Holme-on-Spalding-Moor. The village of Thornton was sometimes distinguished by the suffix "in Spalding Moor".
