= Bursea Chapel =

Chapel in Bursea, East Riding of Yorkshire, England

Coordinates: 53°47′40″N 0°46′35″W

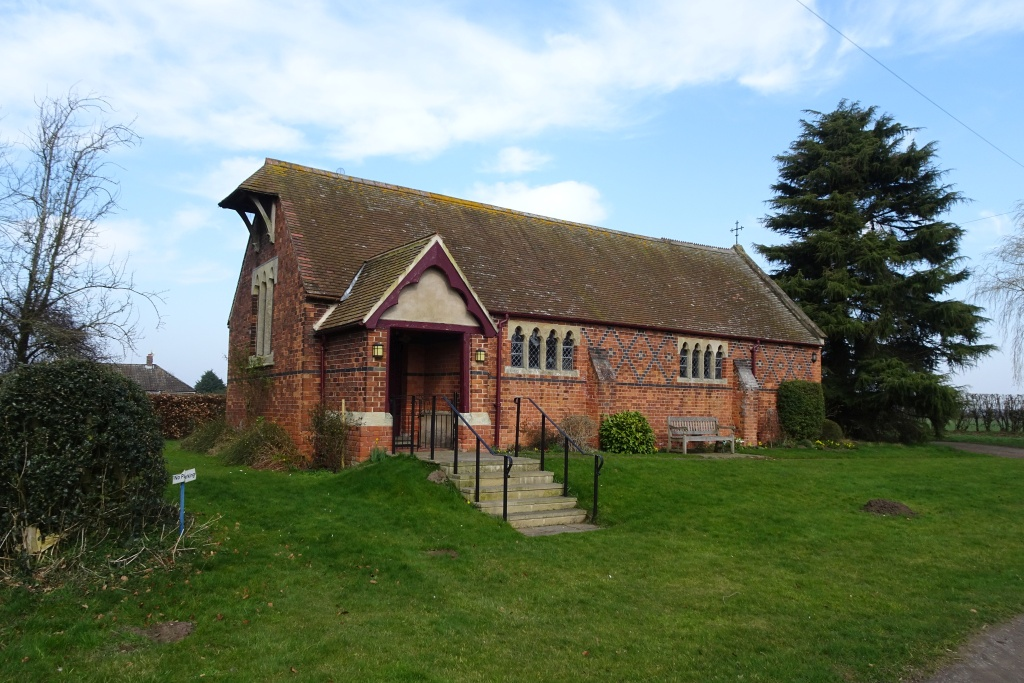
The church, in 2025

Bursea Chapel is a historic Anglican chapel in Bursea, a hamlet in the East Riding of Yorkshire, in England.

There was a chapel in Bursea in the mediaeval period. The current building was constructed on a new site between 1867 and 1872, to a design by William Butterfield. It cost £350, funded by Thomas Sotheron Estcourt, but he and Butterfield had a lengthy dispute over the design and quality of construction. It is a chapel of ease to All Saints' Church, Holme-on-Spalding-Moor. The building was grade II listed in 1987. Nikolaus Pevsner describes is as "very modest, but not without character".

The chapel is built of red brick, with blue brick diapering, stone dressings, and a tile roof with stone gable coping and shaped kneelers. The nave and chancel are in one unit, and there is a south gabled porch. At the west end is a bell under a half-hipped roof. The windows have trefoil-headed lights.

== See also ==
- Listed buildings in Holme-on-Spalding-Moor
