= Listed buildings in Holme-on-Spalding-Moor =

Holme-on-Spalding-Moor is a civil parish in the county of the East Riding of Yorkshire, England. It contains 13 listed buildings that are recorded in the National Heritage List for England. Of these, one is listed at Grade I, the highest of the three grades, one is at Grade II*, the middle grade, and the others are at Grade II, the lowest grade. The parish contains the village of Holme-on-Spalding-Moor, the hamlet of Bursea and the surrounding countryside. The listed buildings include a church, a chapel, a country house and a smaller house, a farmhouse and a barn, a former vicarage, a former lock-up, a school converted into a chapel, a public house, a railway station converted into a house, a bridge and a disused lock.

== Key ==
Grade	Criteria
I	Buildings of exceptional interest, sometimes considered to be internationally important
II*	Particularly important buildings of more than special interest
II	Buildings of national importance and special interest

== Buildings ==
Name and location	Photograph	Date	Notes	Grade
All Saints' Church; 53.84031°N 0.75380°W		13th century	The church has been altered and extended through the centuries, including a restoration between 1906 and 1911 by Temple Moore. It is built in limestone and sandstone, and some brick, and has roofs of lead and pantile. The church consists of a nave with a clerestory, north and south aisles, a south porch, a chancel with a north chapel, and a west tower embraced by the aisles. The tower has three stages, diagonal stepped buttresses rising to pinnacles, and a pointed west doorway with a three-light pointed window above. Over this are string courses, a niche with a canopy containing a statue, two-light bell openings, gargoyles, and an openwork parapet with eight crocketed pinnacles.	I
Holme Hall; 53.83651°N 0.76150°W		c. 1720–30	A country house, later used for other purposes, in brick, the main parts rendered, with roofs of tile and Westmorland slate. The house consists of a main block, a chapel to the northeast, and a servants' wing to the northwest. There are two storeys, and the main block has five bays, and an added bay to the right. The front has pilasters, a floor band, a coved cornice and a blocking course, and a hipped roof. The middle bay projects and contains a porch with pilasters, and a doorway in an architrave, with a fanlight, a moulded cornice, and a panel flanked by consoles. The windows are sashes those on the ground floor in architraves. A two-bay passage with round-headed casement windows links the house to the chapel. The servants' wing has four bays, and contains a French window and casement windows.	II*
Common Farmhouse; 53.80629°N 0.78892°W		Mid-18th century	The farmhouse is in brick, and has a pantile roof with stone gable coping and shaped kneelers. There are two storeys and three bays. The doorway has a fanlight, and the windows are sashes, those on the ground floor under segmental arches.	II
Barn, Common Farm; 53.80632°N 0.78940°W		Mid-18th century	The threshing barn is in brick, and has a pantile roof with stone gable coping and shaped kneelers. There is a single tall storey, and it contains a board door in a projecting centre, and two rows of rectangular vents.	II
The Hollies; 53.84064°N 0.76234°W	—	1778	A vicarage, later used for other purposes, with wings added in 1785–86. The central range is in yellow brick, the wings are in brown brick, and the roof is in pantile. There are two storeys, the centre block has three bays, and the outer projecting gabled wings have two bays and an oculus. The central range has an eaves band, and a parapet with a raised central panel. The middle bay projects slightly and contains a doorway with a canopy on fluted consoles. The windows are replacement casements, those on the central range under slightly cambered arches, and those on the wings with gauged brick flat arches.	II
Holme House; 53.82684°N 0.81144°W	—	1780	The house is in polychrome brick, with a moulded timber cornice and a hipped tile roof. There are two storeys and three bays, the middle bay projecting under an open pediment. In the centre is a Tuscan porch with pilasters, a frieze with a flower motif, an open pediment, and a doorway with a radial fanlight. The windows are sashes under flat rubbed brick arches.	II
Lock-up, Workhouse Farm; 53.82118°N 0.77373°W	—	c. 1790	The surviving lock-up from a previous workhouse. It is in brick with a tile roof, there is a circular plan, and it is about 5 metres (16 ft) in height. The lock-up has a dentilled cornice, and it contains small slit windows on the upper part.	II
The Blacksmith Arms; 53.83664°N 0.7679190°W		1822	The public house is in whitewashed brick, with stone dressings, floor bands, and a hipped tile roof. There are two storeys, three bays, and a rear cross-wing. In the centre is a doorway with a Tuscan surround, attached pillars, a radial fanlight, and a massive modillion cornice. Above it is a sash window, and the outer bays contain two-storey semicircular bow windows with sashes. The windows have keystones, mostly fluted.	II
Old School Chapel; 53.83679°N 0.76690°W	—	1824	Originally a school, later a chapel, it is in brick and has a pantile roof, with tumbled-in brickwork on the gable end. It consists of a main block with two storeys and a single-storey three-bay extension at the rear. The windows are a mix of sashes and casements, some with segmental heads, and there is a datestone with an inscription.	II
Station House; 53.85069°N 0.74367°W		c. 1824	Originally Everingham railway station, later a private house, it was designed by G. T. Andrews for the Selby–Driffield line. It is in yellow brick, with overhanging eaves and a Welsh slate roof. There are two storeys and four bays, the outer bays projecting and gabled, forming wings, and there is a flat-roofed extension to the right. The windows are sashes under cambered gauged brick arches.	II
Bursea Chapel; 53.79445°N 0.77631°W		1867–72	The chapel, designed by William Butterfield, is in red brick, with blue brick diapering, stone dressings, and a tile roof with stone gable coping and shaped kneelers. The nave and chancel are in one unit, and there is a south gabled porch. At the west end is a bell under a half-hipped roof. The windows have trefoil-headed lights.	II
Bridge spanning drainage channel 53.80053°N 0.71919°W		Undated	The bridge carries a road over the drainage channel. It is in brick with stone coping, and consists of a single segmental arch.	II
Sodhouse Lock; 53.79885°N 0.71932°W		Undated	The disused lock on the Market Weighton Canal is in stone with chamfered and coped side walls. There are emplacements for the lock gates, now removed, and at the south end are curved embankment walls.	II
