= Spaldingas =

Anglian tribe that settled in an area known as the Spalda

The Spaldingas ("dwellers of the Spald") were an Anglian tribe that settled in an area known as the Spalda. This divided the fens and marshes of East Anglia in what is now the South Holland part of Lincolnshire. As well as establishing the town of Spalding, first mentioned in a charter by King Æthelbald of Mercia to the monks of Crowland Abbey in 716, they also gave their name to area of Spalding Moor and the village of Spaldington in East Yorkshire.

A tribe living in "Spalda" are mentioned in the Tribal Hidage (7th century). Eilert Ekwall regarded this name as etymologically obscure. He suggested that the tribe may have brought this name (Spaldas) from the Continent where there may have been a corresponding place-name. It would presumably be related to the unrecorded Anglo-Saxon spaldan (to cleave) (OHG spaltan) so the meaning of the noun would be "cleft" or "ravine". However, as there are no ravines in the fenland, all of the above should be treated with caution. Caitlin Green has suggested that the Spaldingas were of mixed Anglo-Saxon and Brittonic origin, due to a significant concentration of British Celtic place names in their territory.

The Spaldingas may have retained their administrative independence within the Kingdom of Mercia into the late 9th century, when Stamford became one of the Five Boroughs of the East Midlands under Danish control.
