= Hull and East Riding Museum =

Museum in Kingston upon Hull, East Riding of Yorkshire, England

Hull and East Riding Museum of Archaeology
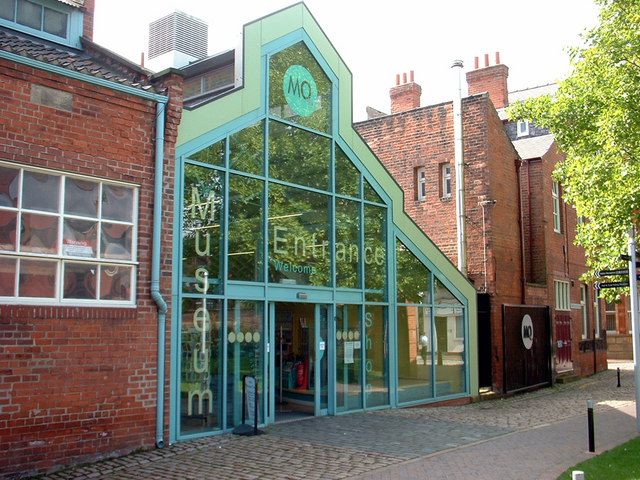
- Established: 1989
- Location: Kingston upon Hull, England
- Coordinates: 53.7434°N 0.3303°W
- Visitors: 76,792 (2014)
- Curator: Caroline Rhodes
- Public transit access: Hull Paragon Interchange (10 minute walk)
- Website: www.hullmuseums.co.uk/hull-east-riding-museum

The Hull and East Riding Museum of Archaeology is located in the Museums Quarter of the Old Town in Kingston upon Hull, England. It dates back to 1925 as the Museum of Commerce and Industry in a former Customs House but acquired its present name in 1989 with a major refurbishment and new entrance, with the transport section moving to a separate museum. It displays items from prehistoric to medieval in the area, many of them in life-size tableaux or reconstructions of rooms and buildings.

== History ==
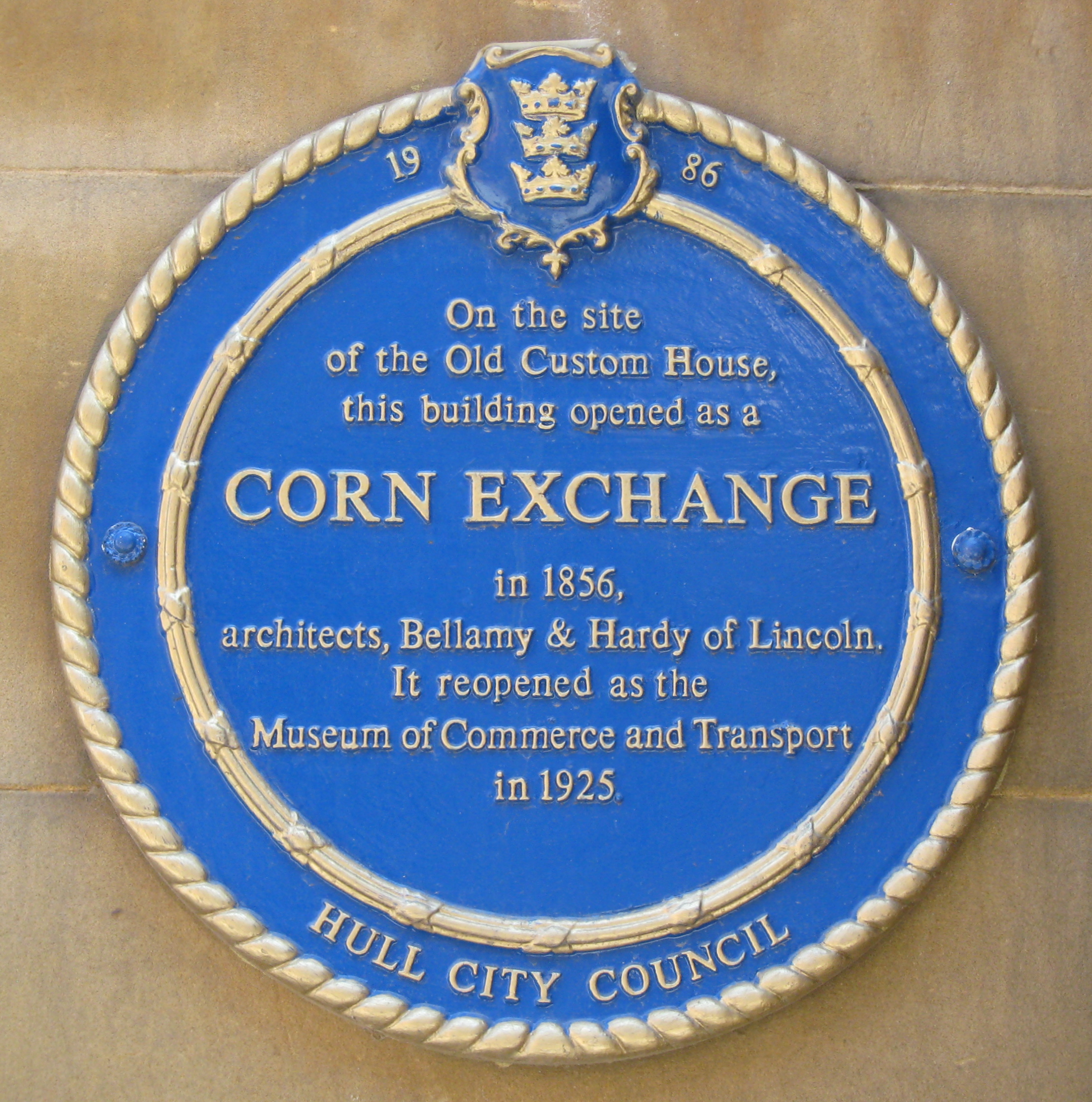
Plaque on High Street

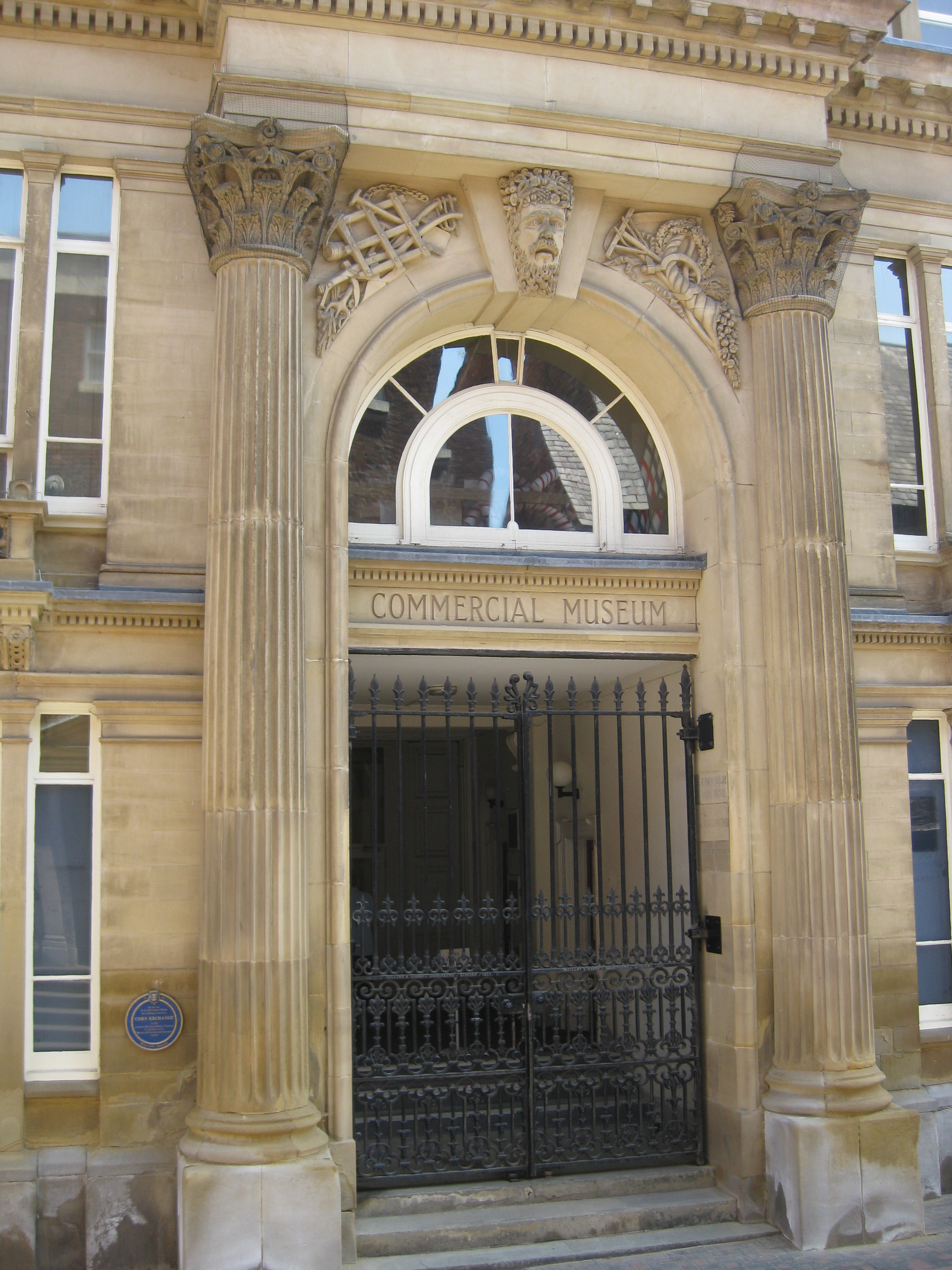
Commercial Museum entrance

Building number 36 on the High Street was originally a customs house. In the mid-1850s, civic leaders decided to replace it with a new corn exchange. The current building was designed by Bellamy and Hardy in the Italianate style, built in ashlar stone and was completed in 1856. The use of the building as a corn exchange declined significantly in the wake of the Great Depression of British Agriculture in the late 19th century. It then fell into disuse and disrepair. The structure was refurbished and opened as a museum in 1925, being the Museum of Commerce and Industry (signed above the door as "Commercial Museum"). It was damaged by bombs during the Second World War but renovated and reopened as the Archaeology and Transport Museum in 1957.

In 1989 the museum was given its present name, and was refurbished as the transport collection moved to a new adjacent museum called Streetlife Museum of Transport. The museum underwent a further major makeover between 1998 and 2003 as part of the creation of the Museums Quarter, with the main entrance transferred from the High Street to the central courtyard.

During the COVID-19 pandemic in England the museum closed to the public on 20 March 2020. It was able to reopen on 17 May 2021.

== Galleries ==
A major feature is several galleries where actual artefacts (found in the region) are displayed in tableaux showing life in a particular time, and includes up to full-size rooms or buildings.

=== Fossils and Early Animals ===
Visitors enter to see a giant woolly mammoth with other extinct animals from the region and some interactive displays including fossils which can be touched.

=== Prehistoric Man ===
This includes a tableau of a woman as a gatherer and explanations of the diet and technology of early humans. There are stone tools and Bronze Age pottery, metal goods and wooden carvings. Many of these were collected by notable archaeologist John Robert Mortimer (1825–1911). The Roos Carr figures are part of the permanent display.

=== Celtic Worlds ===
This includes a reconstruction of substantial parts of an Iron Age village. A translation is available at reception.

=== Boat Lab ===
This shows the Hasholme Logboat, some 41.9-foot-long (12.78 m) and 4.6-foot-wide (1.4 m) carved from a single oak tree, dating back to about 300 BC. There is also part of one of three Ferriby Boats from about 2000 BC, the oldest known sewn plank boats in Europe.

=== Roman World (AD 43–410) ===
This includes a reconstruction of part of the Roman settlement of Petuaria (modern-day Brough, East Riding of Yorkshire). Large (actual) mosaics are displayed as they would have been within houses. A Roman bath house contains not only an original mosaic, but also a life-sized bather. There are also a workshop, office and shop, in which artefacts from the time are displayed as if for sale. A humorous feature is the Latin graffiti Romani ite domum ("Romans go home") on the wall of a building.

The museum displays a number of mosaics which were found at the sites of Roman villas at Rudston, Brantingham and Harpham in the East Riding, and at Horkstow in north Lincolnshire. They are considered to be the best collection of late Roman mosaics to be seen in Britain.

=== Upper galleries ===
These depict life in East Yorkshire from the end of Roman occupation (AD 410) to the outbreak of the English Civil War including the Saxons, the Vikings and Mediaeval Hull. This includes coins, weapons, stone carvings and everyday objects.

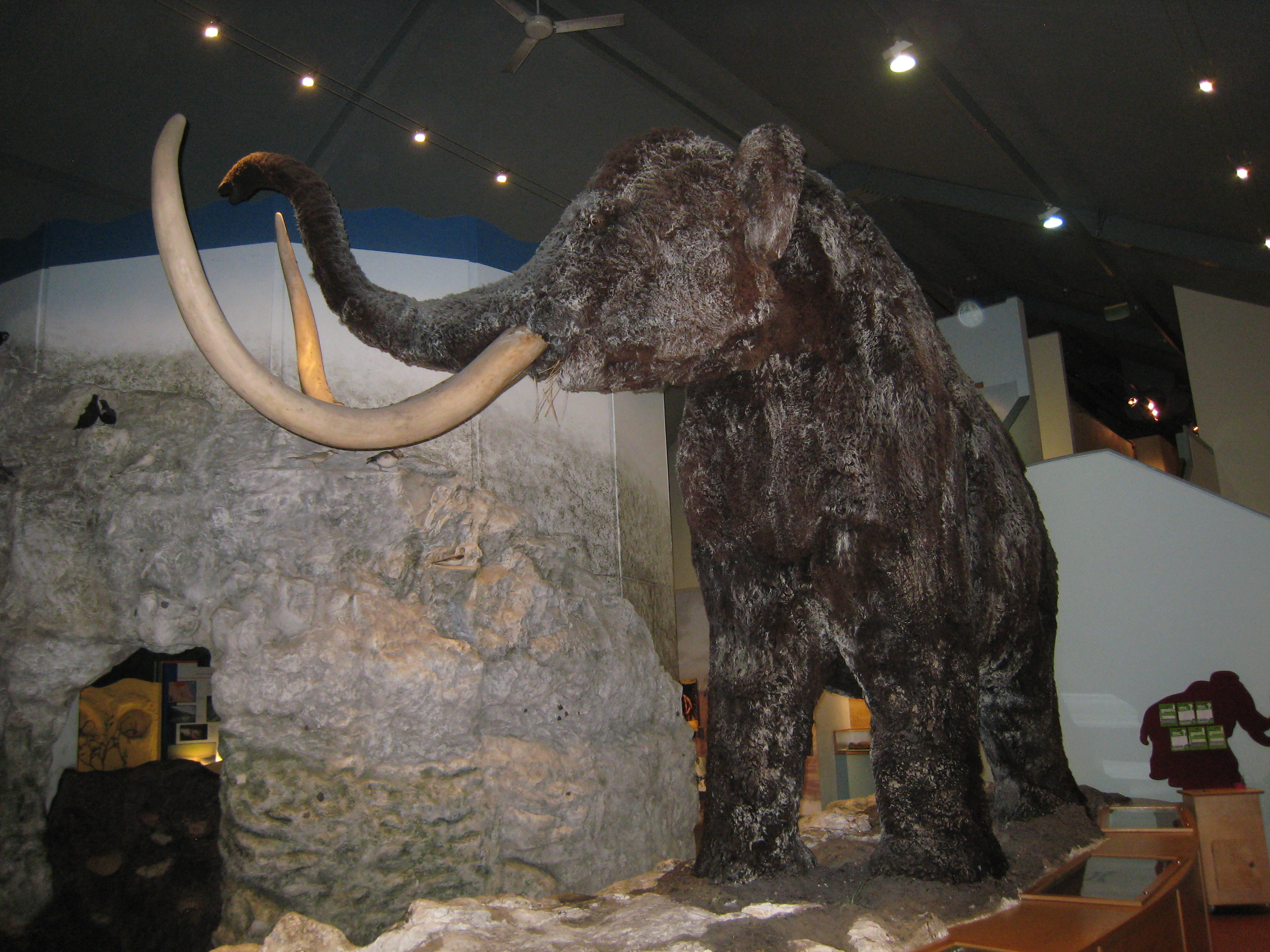
Woolly mammoth

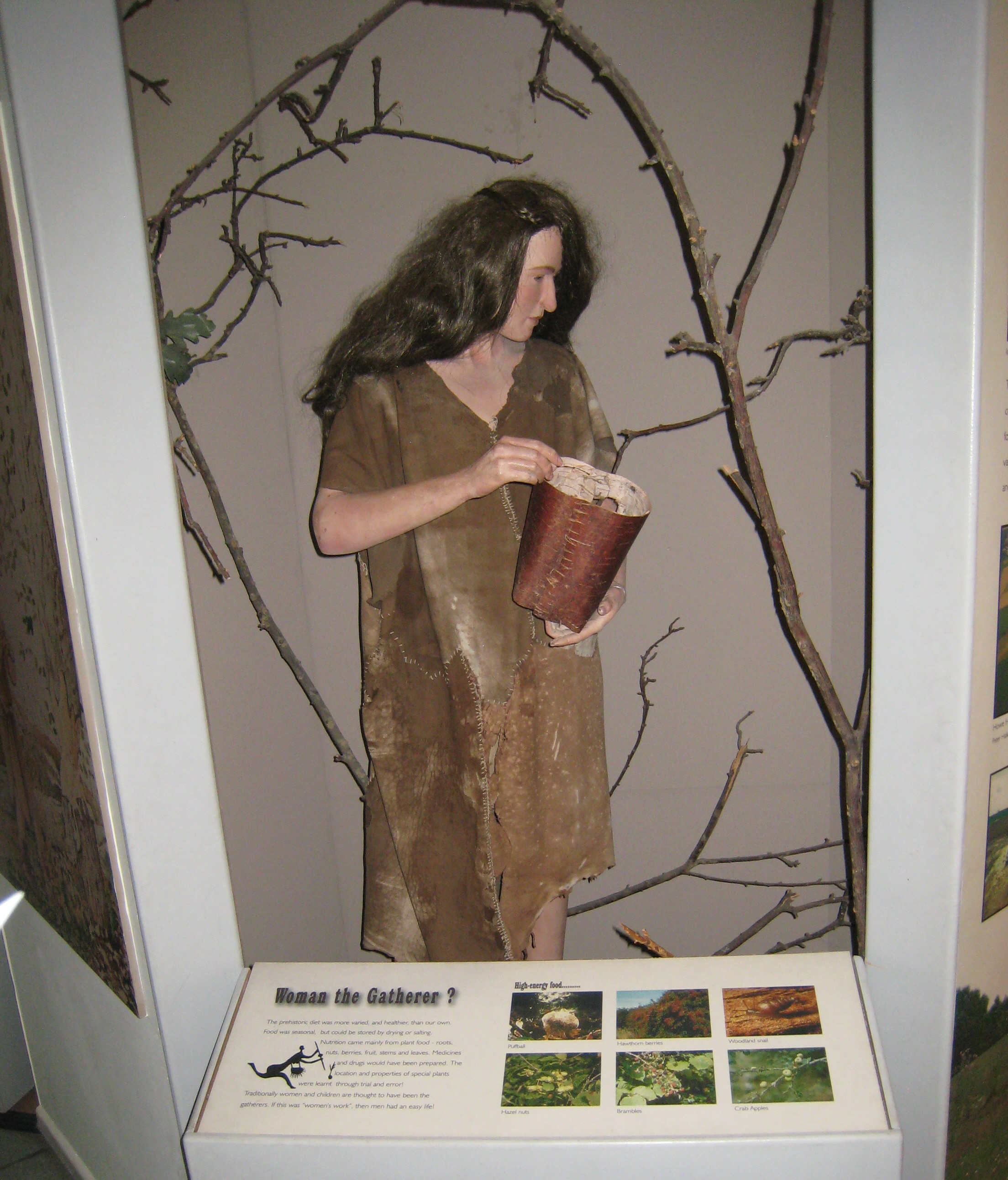
Woman the Gatherer?

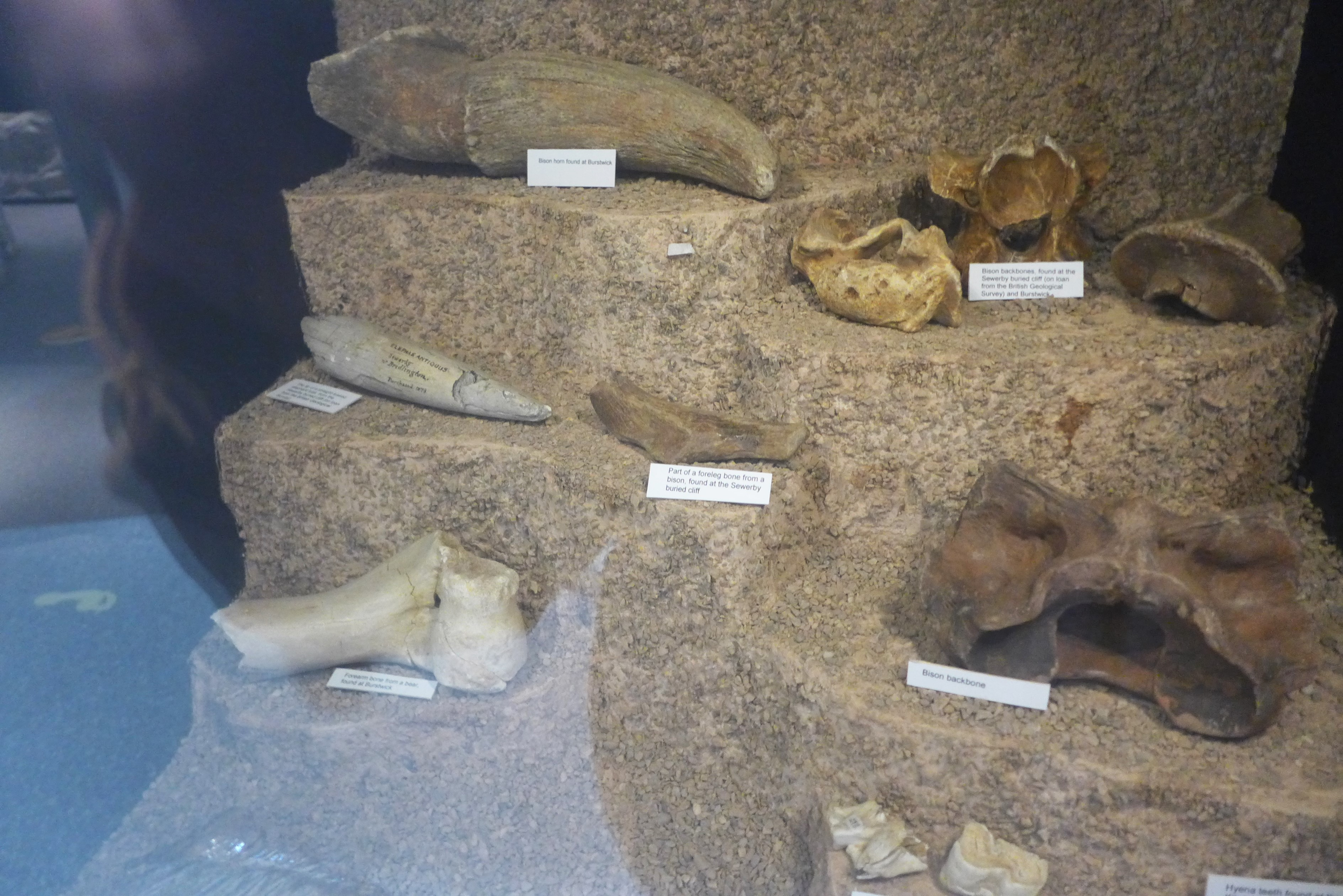
Stone age items

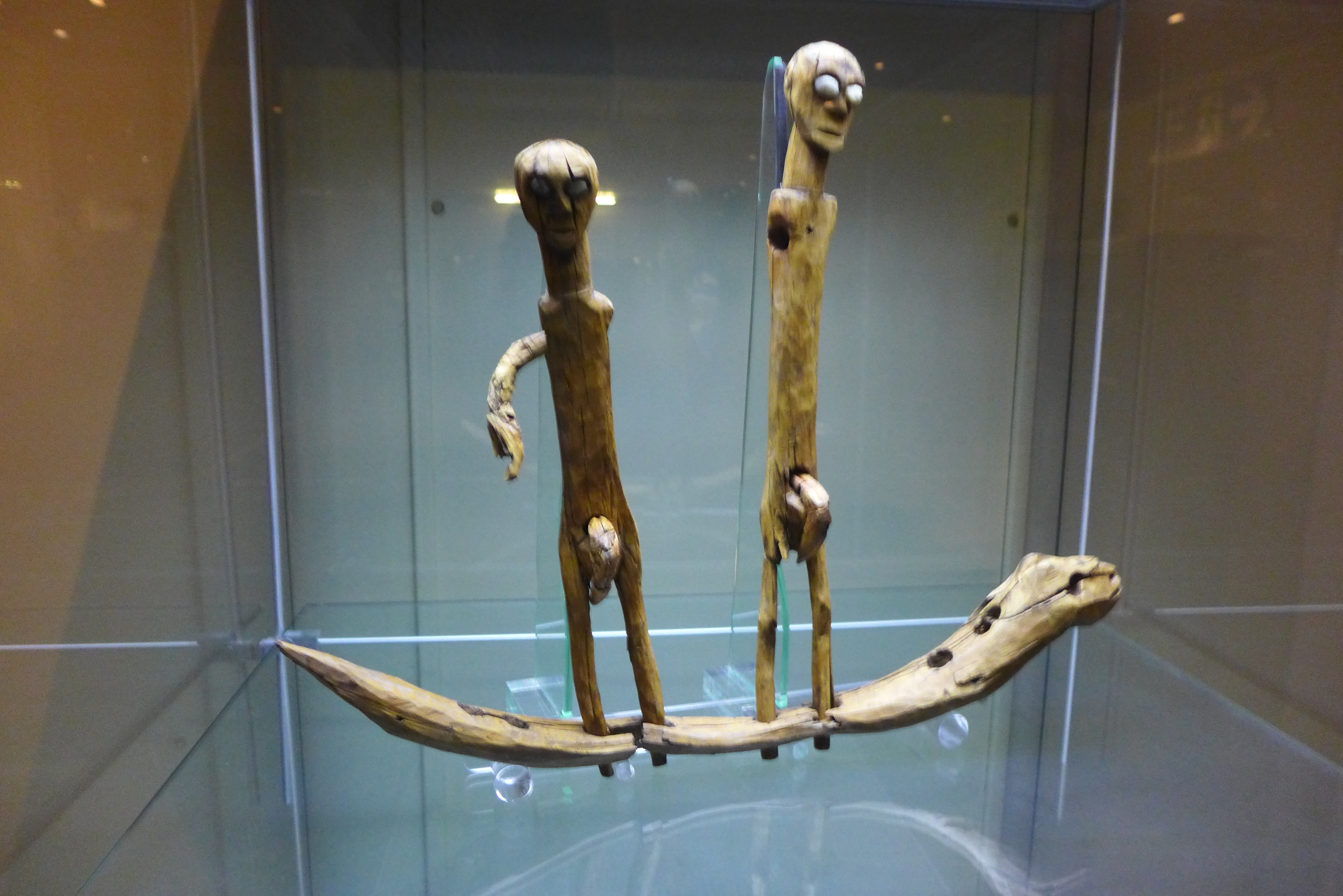
Roos Carr figures

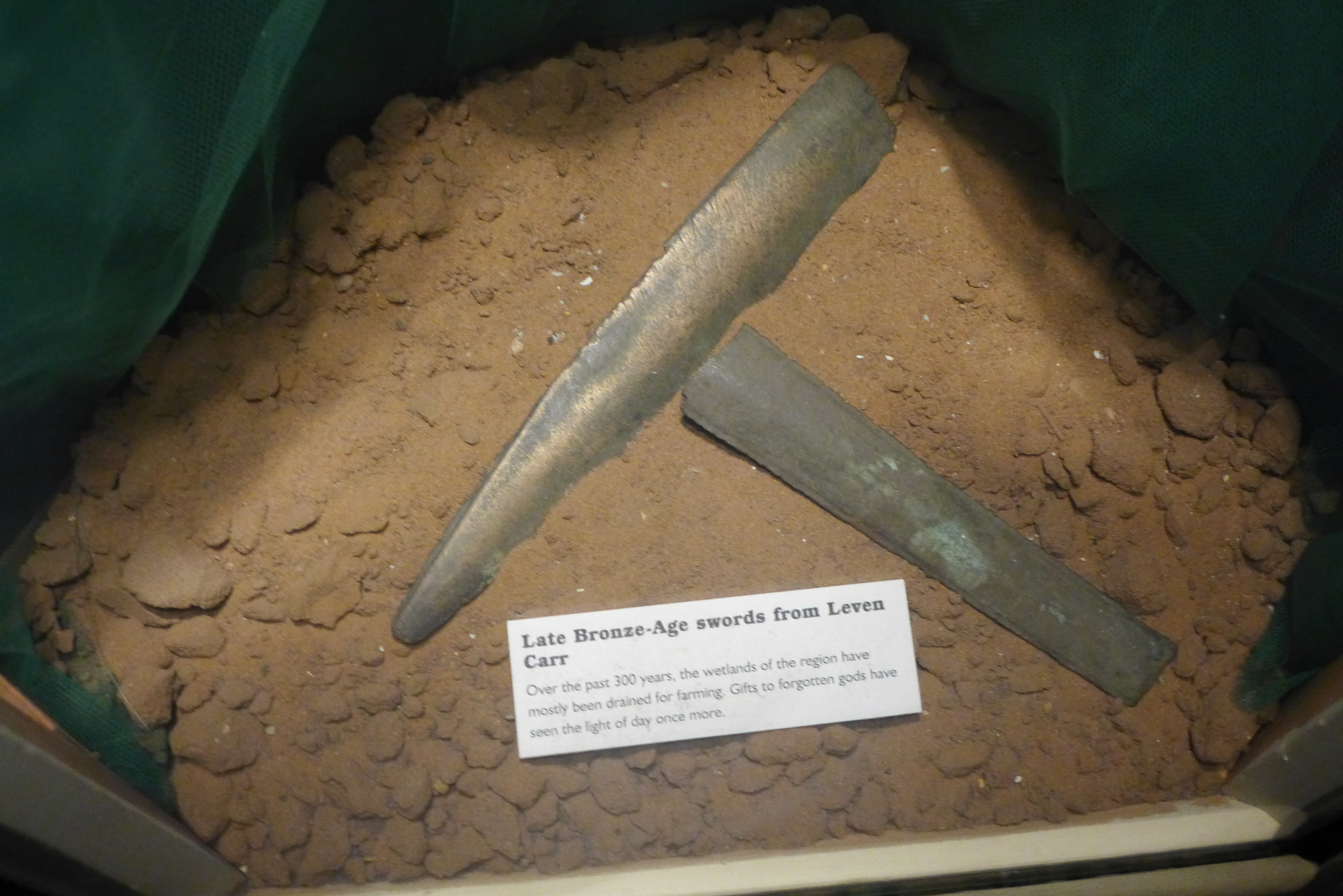
Bronze Age swords

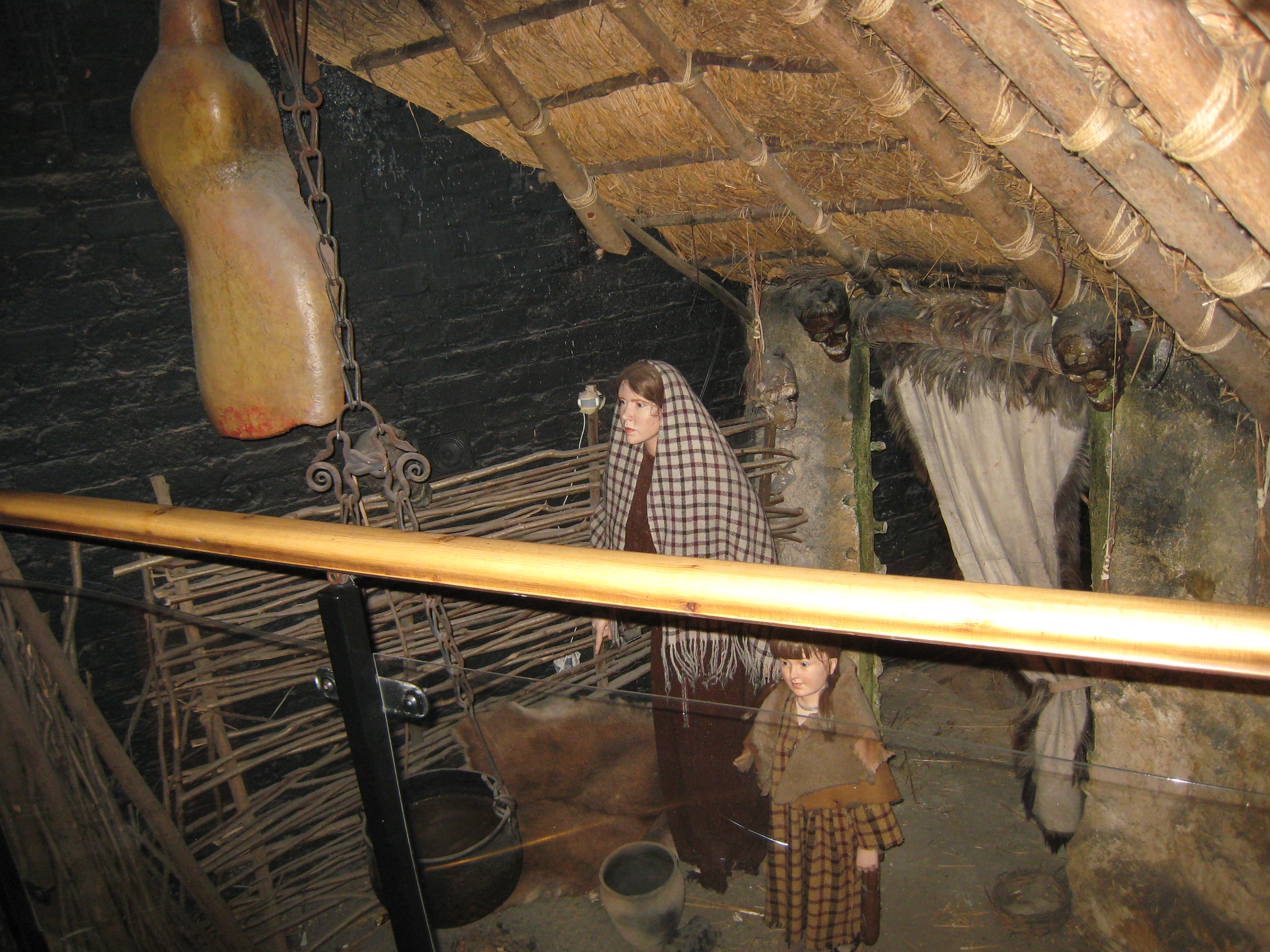
Iron Age village

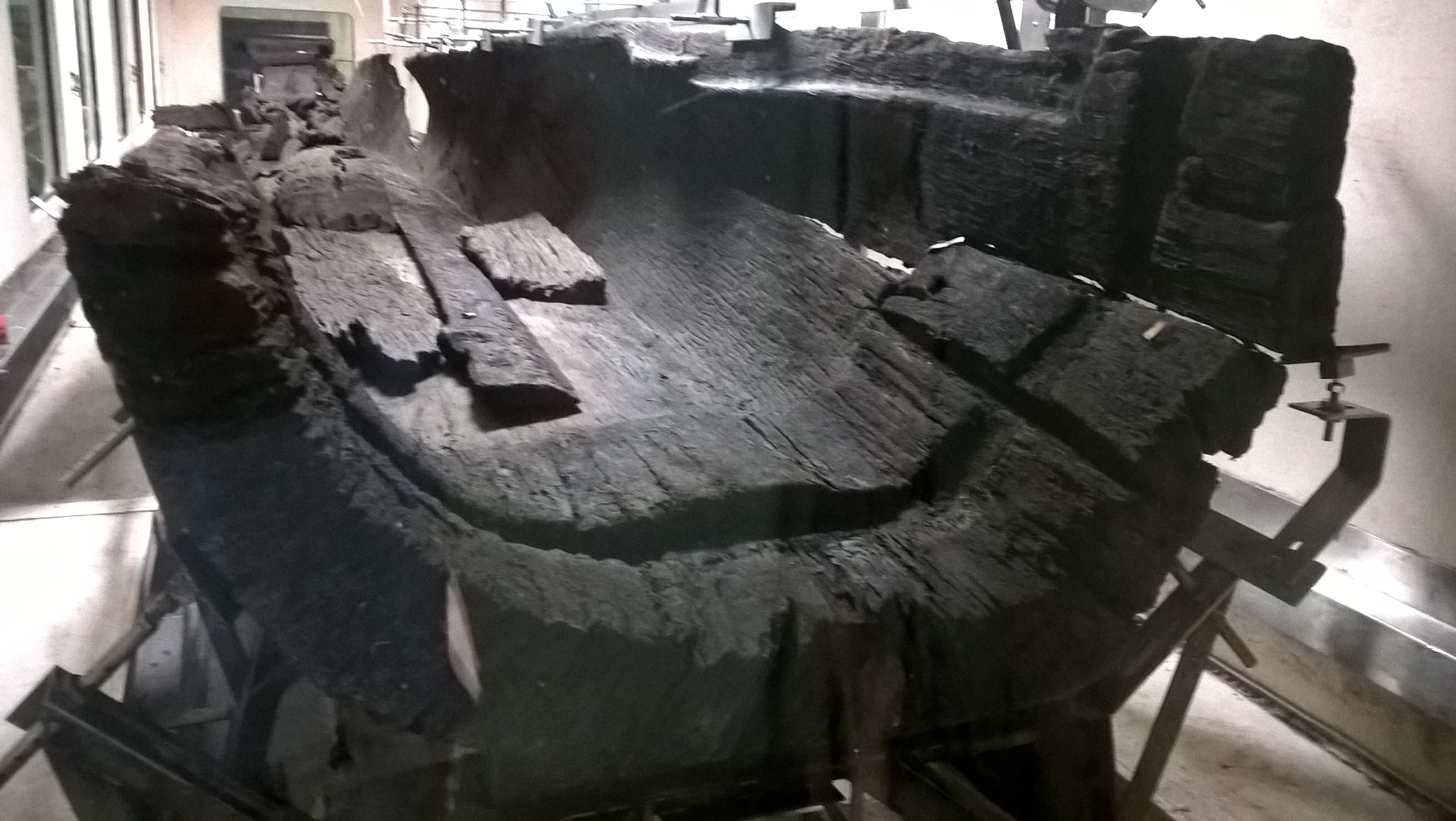
Hasholme log boat

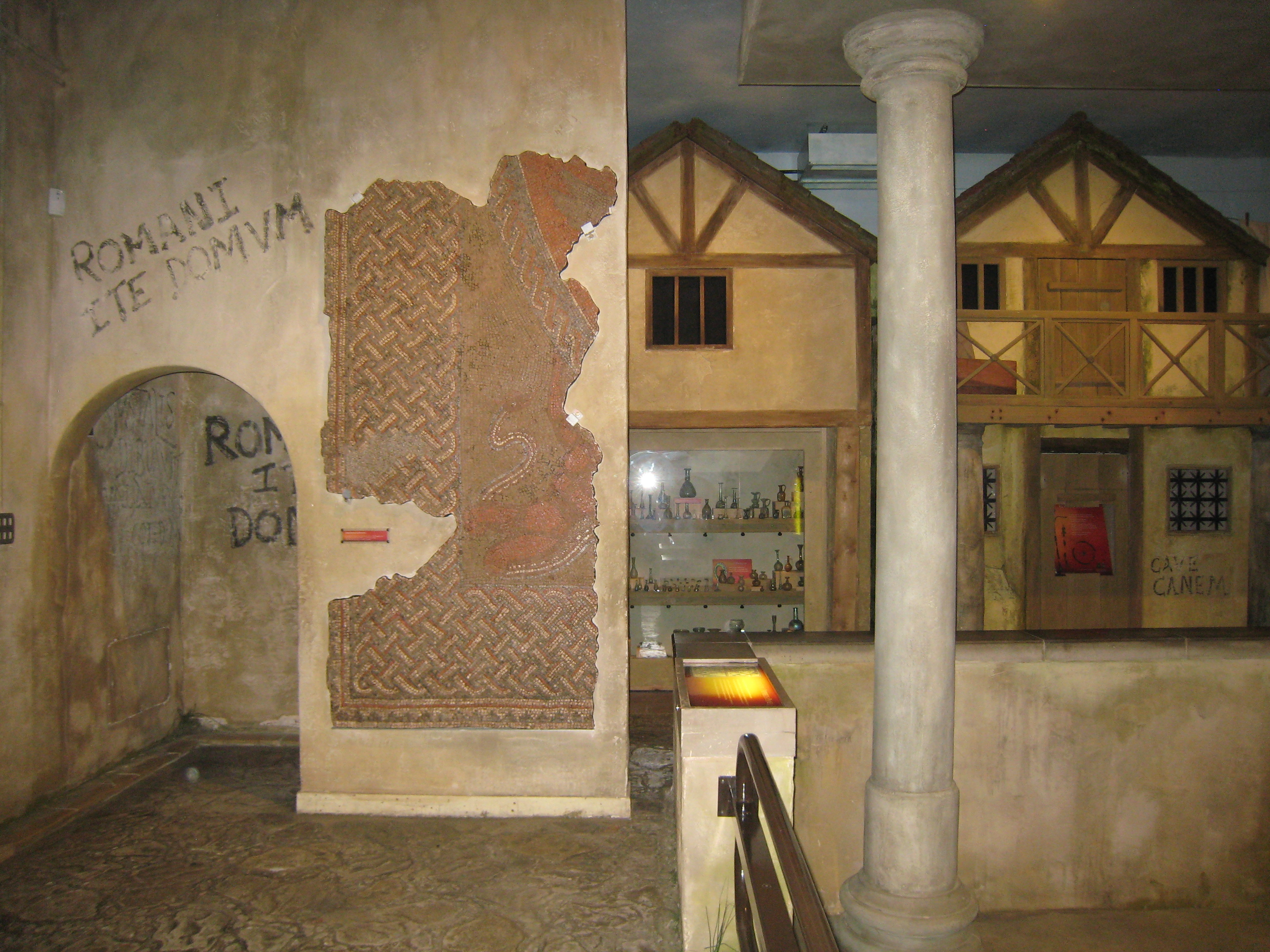
Part of Petuaria "Romans go home"

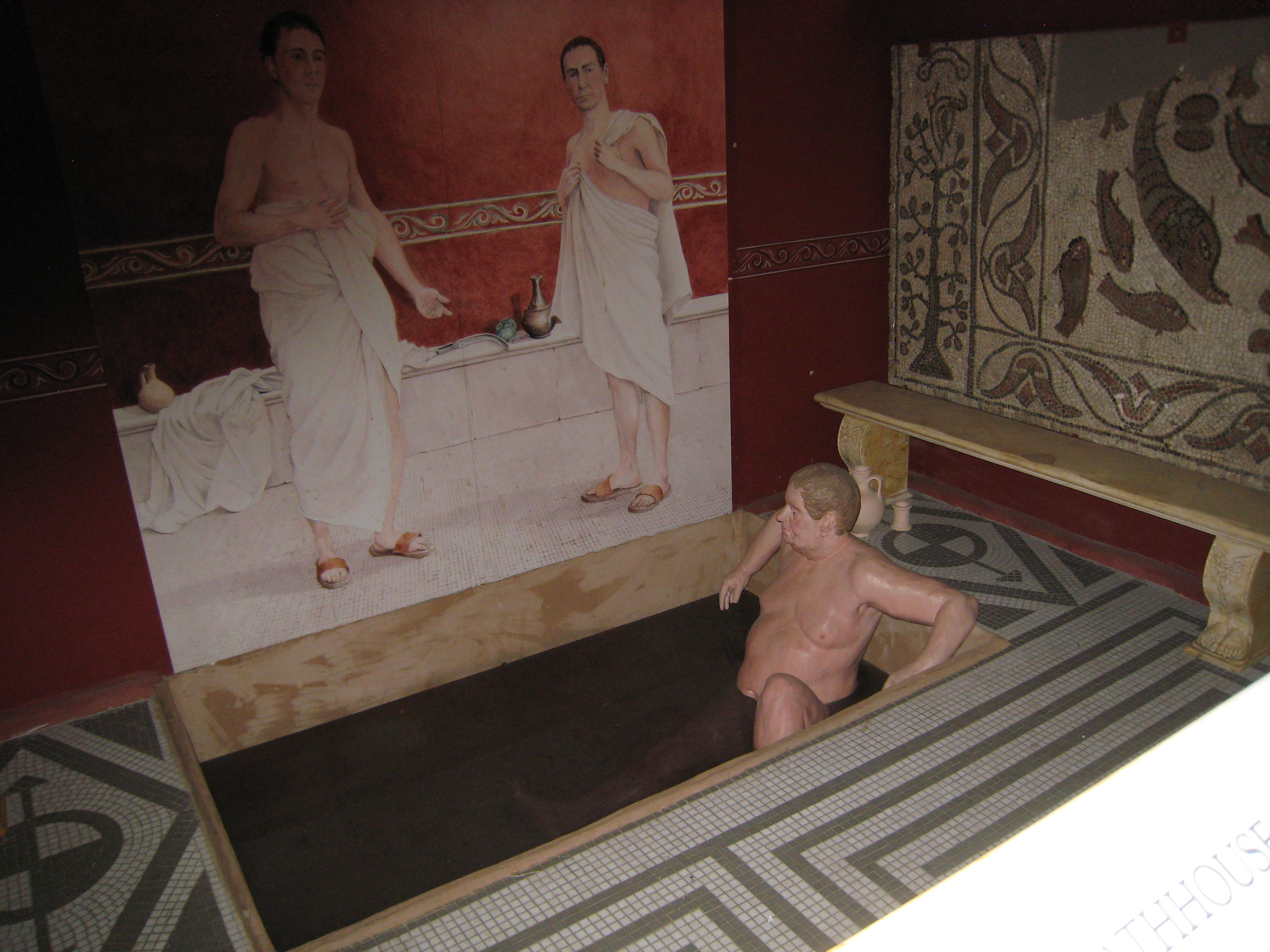
Roman bath house

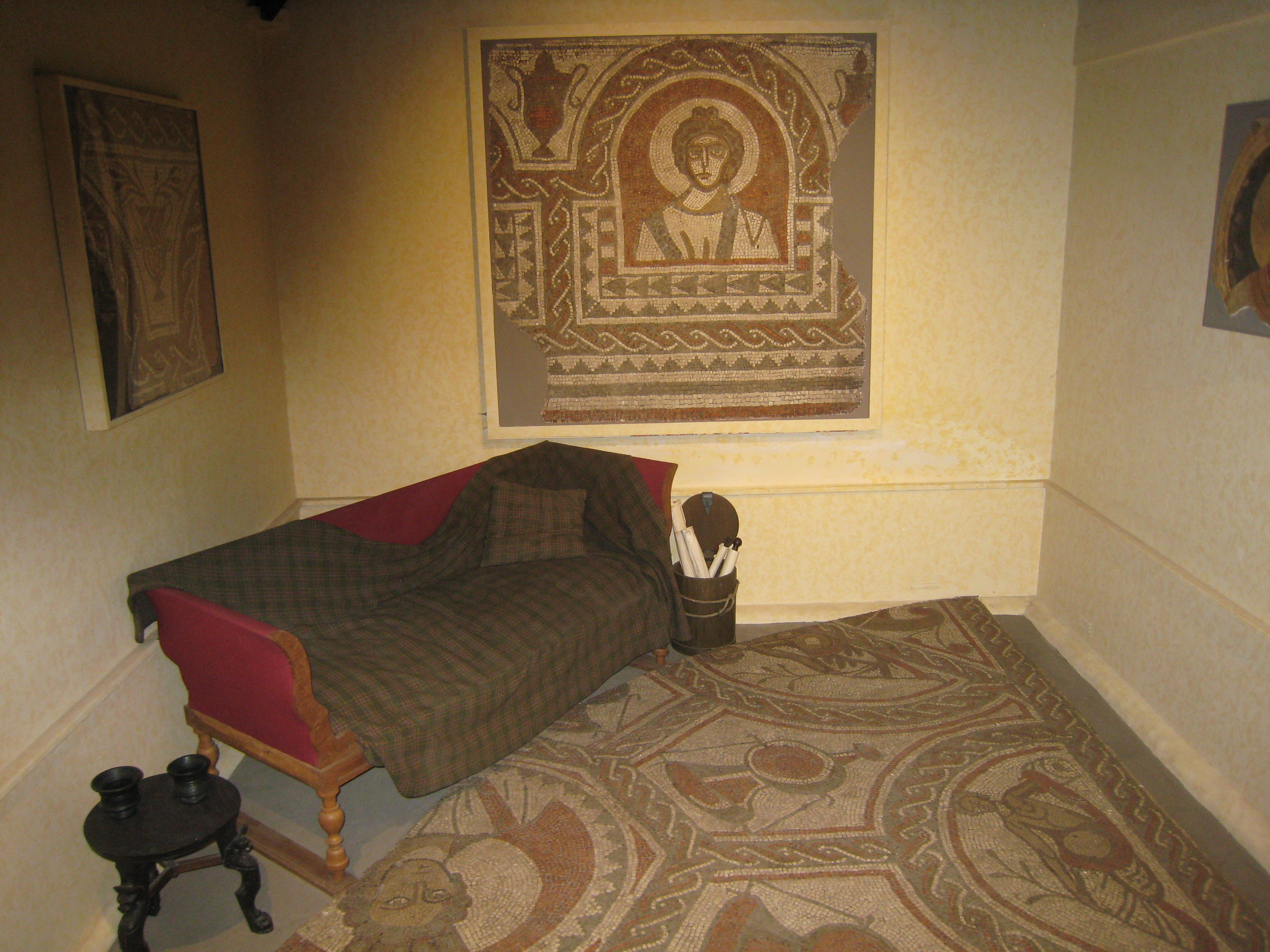
Roman room

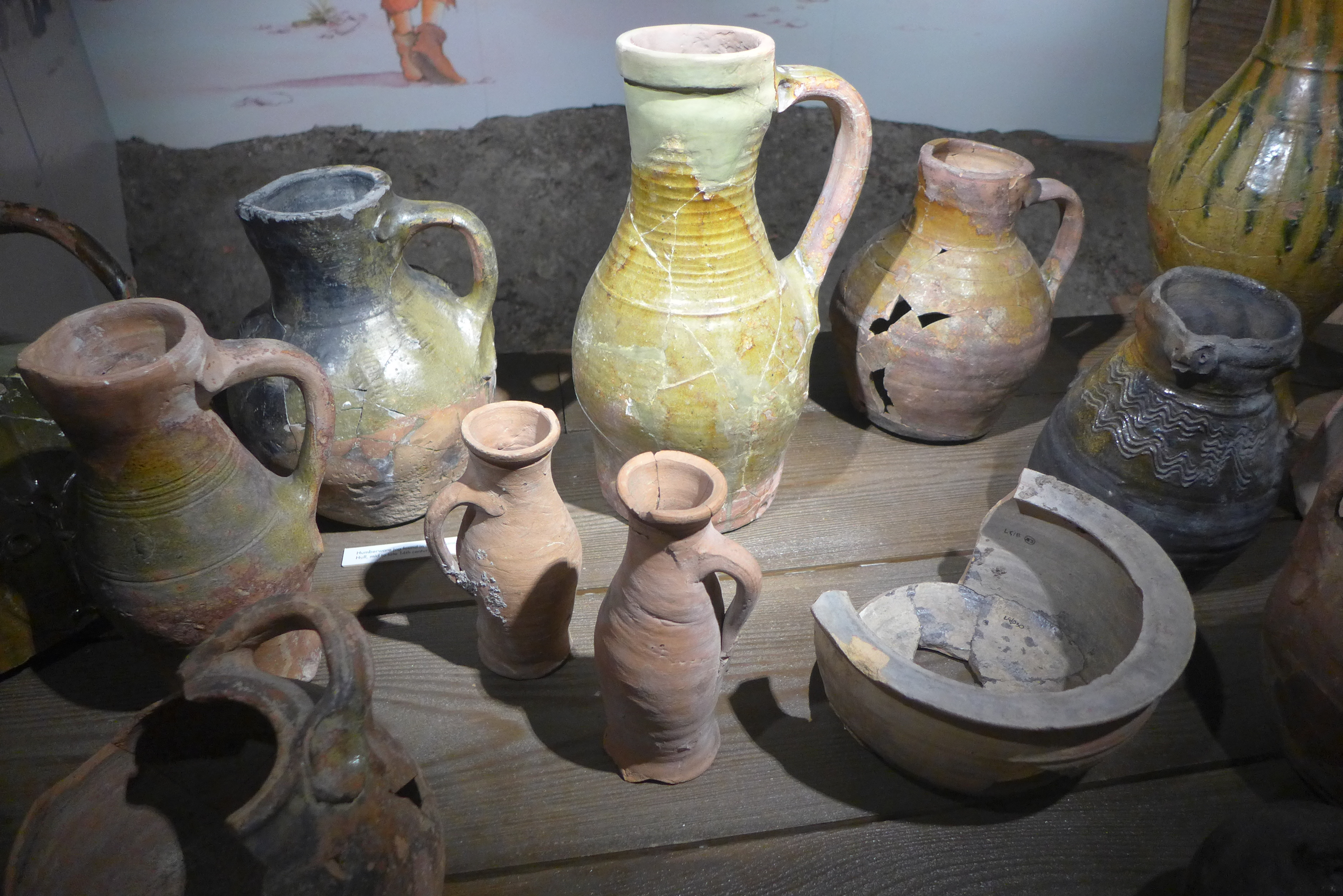
Pottery from Mediaeval Hull

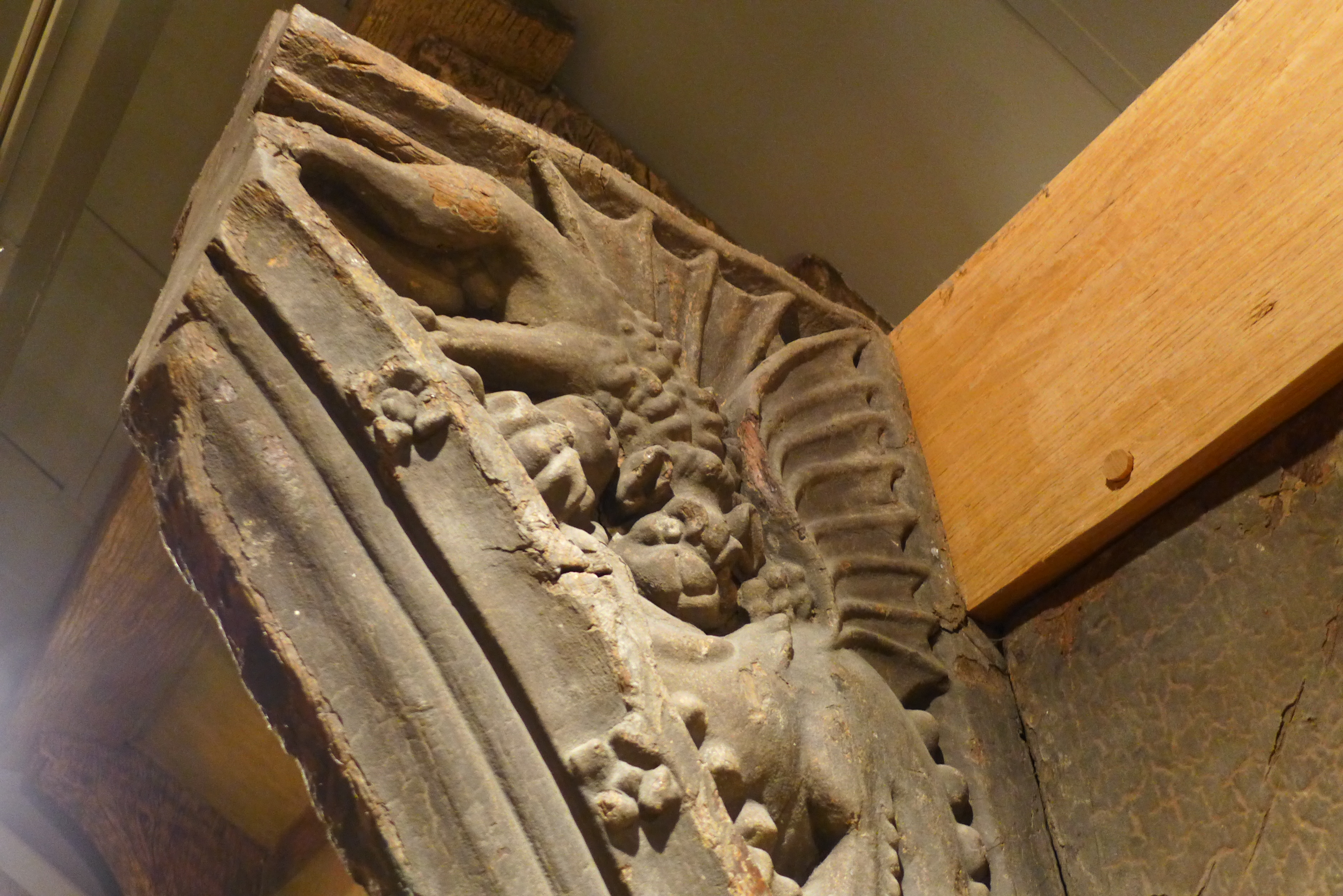
Mediaeval Hull stone carvings

== See also ==
- Corn exchanges in England
