= Welhambridge =

Hamlet in the East Riding of Yorkshire, England

Coordinates: 53.796°N 0.800°W

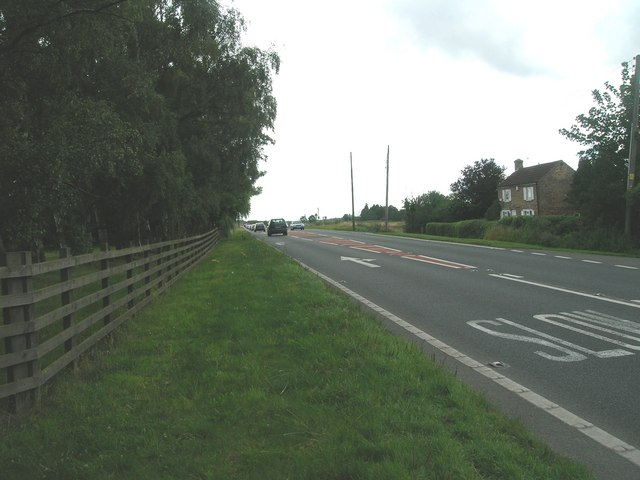
- A614 through Welhambridge

- Location within the East Riding of Yorkshire
- OS grid reference: SE791339
- Civil parish: Holme-on-Spalding-Moor
- Unitary authority: East Riding of Yorkshire
- Ceremonial county: East Riding of Yorkshire
- Region: Yorkshire and the Humber
- Country: England
- Sovereign state: United Kingdom
- Post town: YORK
- Postcode district: YO43
- Dialling code: 01430
- Police: Humberside
- Fire: Humberside
- Ambulance: Yorkshire
- UK Parliament: Goole and Pocklington

Welhambridge or Welham Bridge is a hamlet in the East Riding of Yorkshire, England, approximately 3 miles (4.8 km) south-west of the village of Holme-on-Spalding-Moor and 4 miles (6.4 km) north-east of the market town of Howden. It lies around the bridge carrying the A614 road over the River Foulness.

The hamlet is within the civil parish of Holme-on-Spalding-Moor.
