= Hasholme =

Hamlet in the East Riding of Yorkshire, England

Coordinates: 53.786984°N 0.750421°W

- Location within the East Riding of Yorkshire
- OS grid reference: SE824330
  - London: 160 mi (260 km) S
- Civil parish: Holme-on-Spalding-Moor
- Unitary authority: East Riding of Yorkshire
- Ceremonial county: East Riding of Yorkshire
- Region: Yorkshire and the Humber
- Country: England
- Sovereign state: United Kingdom
- Post town: YORK
- Postcode district: YO43
- Dialling code: 01430
- Police: Humberside
- Fire: Humberside
- Ambulance: Yorkshire
- UK Parliament: Goole and Pocklington

Hasholme is a hamlet in the East Riding of Yorkshire, England. It is situated approximately 3.5 miles (5.6 km) south of the village of Holme-on-Spalding-Moor and 5.5 miles (9 km) north-east of the market town of Howden. It lies to the north of the River Foulness.

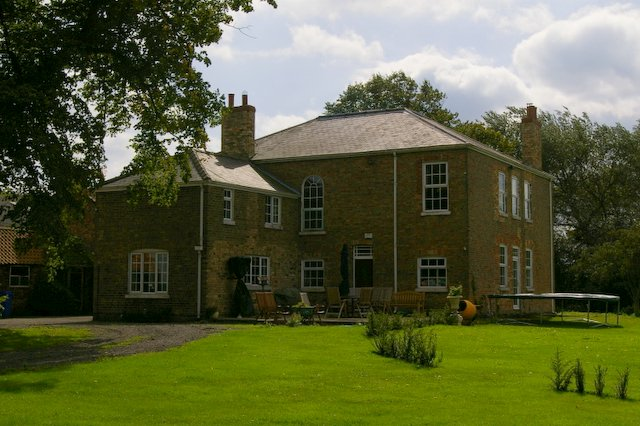
Hasholme Hall

Hasholme forms part of the civil parish of Holme-on-Spalding-Moor.
