= All Saints' Church, Holme-on-Spalding-Moor =

Church in the East Riding of Yorkshire, England

Coordinates: 53°50′25″N 0°45′14″W

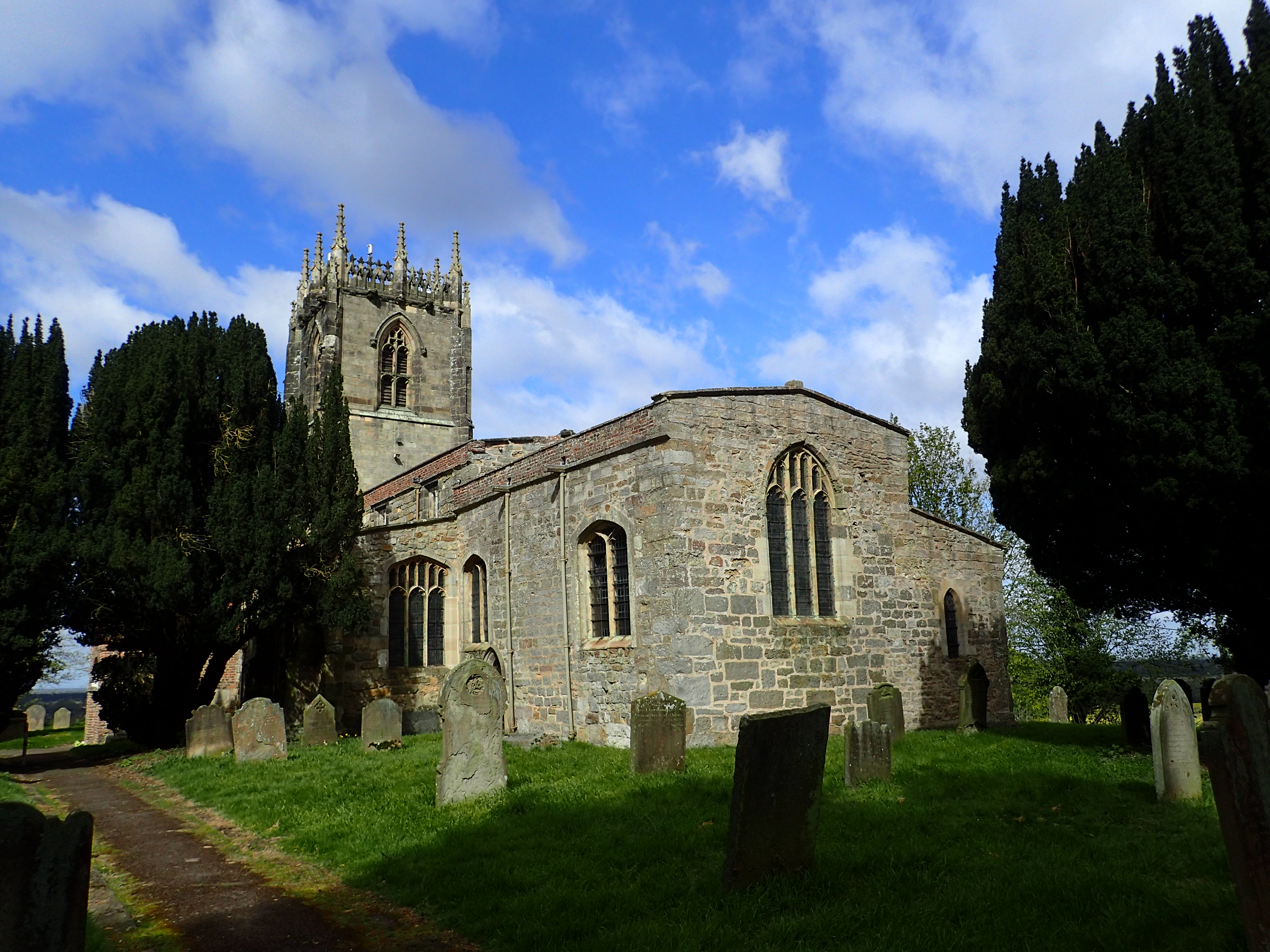
The church, in 2024

All Saints' Church is the parish church of Holme-on-Spalding-Moor, a village in the East Riding of Yorkshire.

There was a church in Holme-on-Spalding-Moor at the time of the Domesday Book. The current church was built in the 13th century. The tower was heightened in the 15th century and a clerestory was constructed. A gallery was added to the nave in 1767, and a porch was added around this time. In 1842 the church was repaired and the pews replaced. Between 1906 and 1911, the church was restored by Temple Moore. The building was grade I listed in 1966.

The church is built of limestone and sandstone, and some brick, and has roofs of lead and pantile. It consists of a nave with a clerestory, north and south aisles, a south porch, a chancel with a north chapel, and a west tower embraced by the aisles. The tower has three stages, diagonal stepped buttresses rising to pinnacles, and a pointed west doorway with a three-light pointed window above. Over this are string courses, a niche with a canopy containing a statue, two-light bell openings, gargoyles, and an openwork parapet with eight crocketed pinnacles. Inside, there is a 17th-century pulpit, and the north chapel has a Perpendicular Gothic screen.

== See also ==
- Grade I listed buildings in the East Riding of Yorkshire
- Listed buildings in Holme-on-Spalding-Moor
