= Holme-on-Spalding-Moor =

Village and civil parish in the East Riding of Yorkshire, England

Coordinates: 53°50′05″N 0°46′35″W

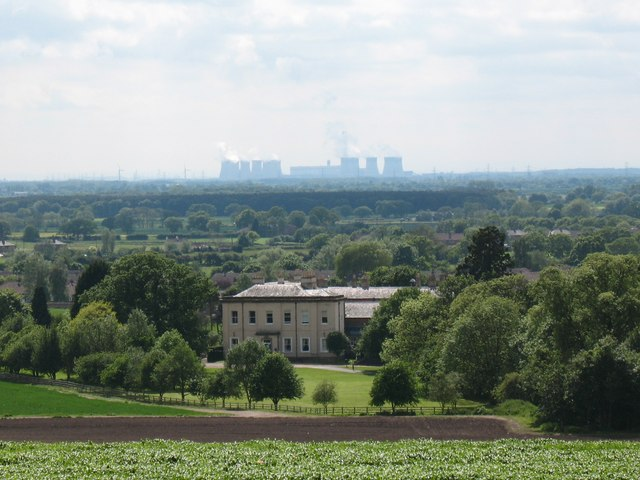
- Holme Hall

- Location within the East Riding of Yorkshire
- Population: 3,172 (2011 census)
- OS grid reference: SE805385
  - London: 160 mi (260 km) S
- Civil parish: Holme-on-Spalding-Moor
- Unitary authority: East Riding of Yorkshire
- Ceremonial county: East Riding of Yorkshire
- Region: Yorkshire and the Humber
- Country: England
- Sovereign state: United Kingdom
- Post town: YORK
- Postcode district: YO43
- Dialling code: 01430
- Police: Humberside
- Fire: Humberside
- Ambulance: Yorkshire
- UK Parliament: Goole and Pocklington

Holme-on-Spalding-Moor (also known as Holme-upon-Spalding-Moor) is a large village and civil parish in the East Riding of Yorkshire, England. It is situated approximately 7 miles (11 km) north-east of Howden and 5 miles (8 km) south-west of Market Weighton. It lies on the A163 road where it joins the A614 road.

The civil parish is formed by the village of Holme-on-Spalding-Moor and the hamlets of Bursea, Hasholme, Tollingham and Welhambridge. According to the 2011 UK Census, Holme-on-Spalding-Moor parish had a population of 3,172, an increase on the 2001 UK Census figure of 2,948.

== History ==
Holme-on-Spalding-Moor village is named for its location on the Spalding Moor. In very early censuses of England (before the 16th century) the village was sometimes listed as Holme, Spalding Moor, Yorkshire, though there is little evidence of any other towns scattered across the moor at that or any time. The word Holme is Danish origin and means island.

Spalding Moor was a marsh, dominated by a single hill which consists of Keuper marl; on the hill a small church was built in the 13th century which served as a landmark across the moor. The village was built on the holme west of the church, hence the name.

Through the 17th and 18th centuries, the main occupation for people in the village was growing and dressing hemp. This gave rise to it sometimes been referred to as "Hemp-Holme".

In July 1984, a late Iron Age logboat (750–390 BC), now known as the Hasholme Logboat, was discovered at Hasholme in the south-east of the parish. The area was also noted for being a centre of Roman pottery. Numerous excavations have taken place since 1853, when several urns that had been found in the village were donated to the Yorkshire Philosophical Society.

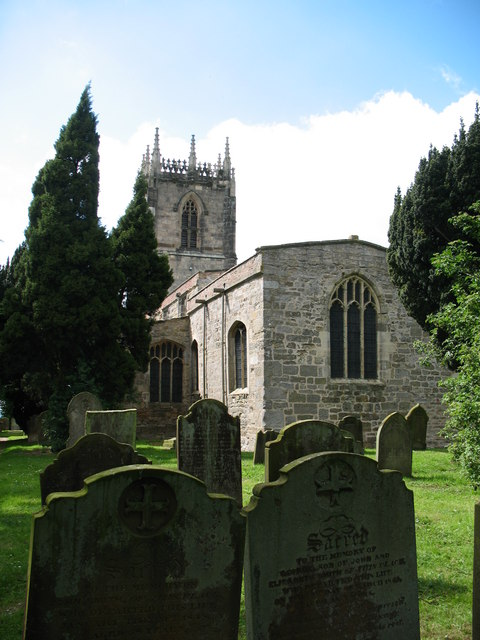
All Saints' Church

In 1823, Holme-on-Spalding-Moor was in the Wapentake of Harthill. Baines' History, Directory and Gazetteer of the County of York records the alternative village name of "Hemp Holme", taken from the parish' former cultivation of hemp. A bed of gypsum was recorded in which ammonites were found. The church stands in an elevated position, on which is also sited a beacon, which gave its name of Holme Beacon to this contemporary part of Harthill Wapentake. The parish church and rectory was in the patronage of St John's College, Cambridge. There were two chapels, one Roman Catholic, the other, Methodist. Local landowners allotted land (cow-gates), for the personal use of their labourers. Population at the time was 1318. Occupations included twenty-three farmers and yeomen, three blacksmiths, two wheelwrights, three shoemakers, four shopkeepers, two coal dealers, two corn millers, a tailor, a butcher, a joiner, a bricklayer, and an ornamental plasterer. There were the landlords of The New Inn, The Hare and Hounds, The Sun, and The Blacksmiths' public houses. A carrier operated between the village and Market Weighton on Wednesdays, and Howden on Saturdays. Within the parish lived a banker, a steward to Lady Stourton [Mary Langdale], Charles Langdale at the Hall, a gentleman and a gentlewoman, a surgeon, and the parish rector. Baines records a traditional belief that a cell for two monks was founded at Welham Bridge on the edge of Spalding Moor by vavasours or constables. One monk was charged with guiding people over wasteland, the other praying for the safety of travellers.

Holme-on-Spalding-Moor was served by Holme Moor railway station on the Selby to Driffield Line between 1848 and 1954.

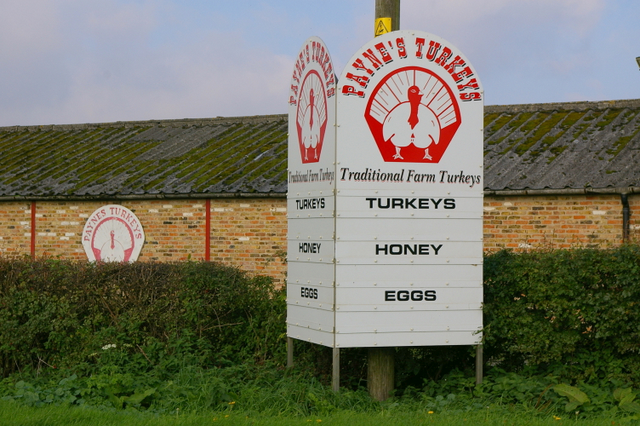
Payne's Turkey Farm

Holme Hall is a country house which was the seat of the Langdale barony. The hall was designated a Grade II* listed building in 1966 and is now recorded in the National Heritage List for England, maintained by Historic England. It is now a Sue Ryder Care Home. The chapel is in use as the village's Roman Catholic church

=== RAF ===
The moor was the site of a Royal Air Force station, RAF Holme-on-Spalding Moor, which was active during the Second World War and for several years thereafter as a bomber facility, being officially closed in 1954 and transferred to the U.S. Air Force. The USAF moved out in 1957, and the field was sold to a private firm.

It continued in private hands until 1984, when its last tenant, British Aerospace, moved out. It was in a rather dilapidated condition by that time, and upon its closing several of the more notable buildings were destroyed and the runways removed. The hangars and several other buildings remain and are used by a variety of industrial and agricultural tenants, though all are in various states of disrepair.

== Amenities ==
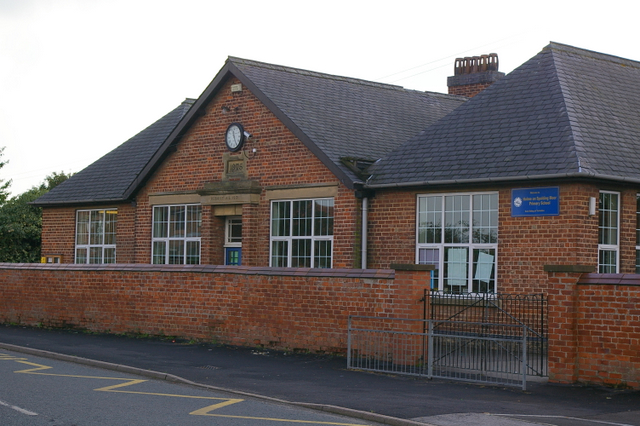
Holme On Spalding Moor Primary School

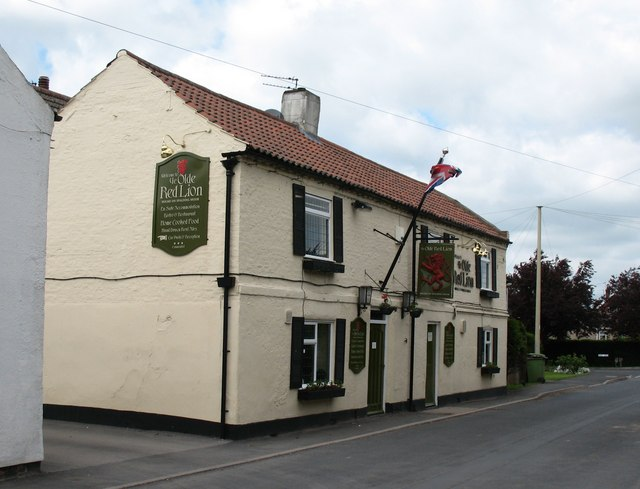
The Olde Red Lion public house

There are several churches, the largest being All Saints' Church, Holme-on-Spalding-Moor, which was mostly built in the 13th century, although a church is mentioned in the Domesday Book. The church was designated a Grade I listed building in 1966 and is now recorded in the National Heritage List for England, maintained by Historic England. There is also a Roman Catholic church, a Methodist church (formerly Primitive Methodist) and a Christian Fellowship church in the village. The Zion (ex-Wesleyan) Methodist Church closed in 1987 and is now a private house.

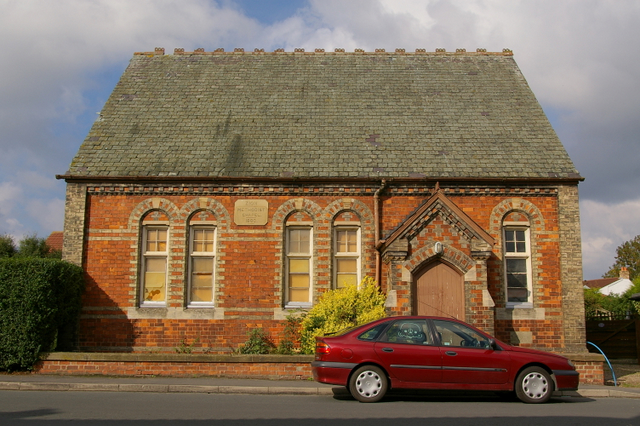
The Zion Chapel

The village is served by bus services run by East Yorkshire Motor Services and York Pullman. The nearest railway stations are to the south of the village: Howden at 7.5 miles (12 km), and Eastrington at 5.5 miles (9 km).

The village's football team Holme Rovers was founded in 1922 by local residents. They play in the East Riding County League Premier division. The club won the top level of the York Football League during the 1962–63 season and the East Riding Senior Cup in 2007.

== Notable people ==
- Marmaduke Langdale, royalist commander in the English Civil War.
- Alec Horsley founder of Northern Dairies.
- Charles Yate, English soldier and politician.

== In fiction ==
Henry VIII's Progress to the North in 1541 passes through Holme in C. J. Sansom's third Shardlake novel Sovereign.

== See also ==
- Listed buildings in Holme-on-Spalding-Moor
