= Market Weighton Canal =

Canal in the East Riding of Yorkshire, England

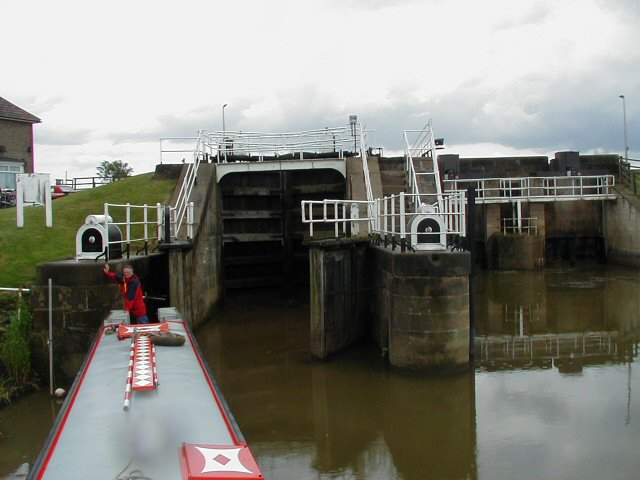
- Weighton Lock at the entrance to the canal

Specifications
- Locks: 4
- Status: Part navigable
- Navigation authority: Environment Agency

History
- Date of act: 1772
- Date completed: 1782
- Date closed: 1971

Geography
- Start point: below Market Weighton
- End point: Broomfleet
- Connects to: Humber Estuary

The Market Weighton Canal ran 9.5 miles (15.3 km) from the Humber Estuary to its terminus near Market Weighton. It gained its act of Parliament in 1772 and opened in 1782. The 3.5 miles (5.6 km) closest to Market Weighton was abandoned in 1900 and the right of navigation through Weighton lock was lost in 1971. However, as of 2002 the lock was passable and the canal usable up to the junction with the River Foulness where silt has made it impassable. Also there is no right of navigation under the M62 motorway bridge to the north of Newport.

== History ==
The canal was conceived as part of a wider scheme to drain the low-lying land and fens between the Humber Estuary and Market Weighton. Some 50,000 acres (20,000 ha) of land were threatened by flooding, both from rain and from water flowing into the area from a larger catchment covering 80,000 acres (32,000 ha), including the East Yorkshire Wolds, which border the area to the east. Before the scheme, most of the lower area was marshland, while the upper area suffered from waterlogging, and was only suitable for grazing of animals. In 2012 the Market Weighton Drainage Board amalgamated with the neighbouring Lower Ouse Internal Drainage Board to form the Ouse and Humber Drainage Board. Along with its main tributary, the River Foulness which is managed and maintained by the Ouse and Humber Drainage Board, the canal is responsible for the land drainage and flood risk management of this heavily modified, man made landscape.

The first scheme was for a line from the Humber to Wholsea, near Sod House lock, with a branch to Pocklington and another to Weighton. It was proposed in October 1765, and again in August 1767. By April 1771, it had become a navigable drain, and by December, the branch to Pocklington had been dropped. The scheme eventually put before Parliament was for a new cut from Market Weighton to the River Foulness, which would be straightened from the junction to the Humber. The channel would be used as a canal and as a drain.

Market Weighton Act 1772
- Act of Parliament
- Parliament of Great Britain
- Long title: An Act for draining and preserving certain Commons, Low Grounds, and Carrs, in the Parish of Market Weighton, and other adjacent Parishes in the Fast Riding of the County of York; and for making a Navigable Cut or Canal from Market Weighton to the River Humber.
- Citation: 12 Geo. 3. c. 37
- Territorial extent: Great Britain

Dates
- Royal assent: 21 May 1772
- Commencement: 21 January 1772 (Note: Start of session.)
Other legislation
Amended by	SI 1983/52
Relates to	York and North Midland Railway (Canals Purchase) Act 1847

Status: Amended

Text of statute as originally enacted

The scheme was authorised by an act of Parliament of 21 May 1772, the Market Weighton Act 1772 (12 Geo. 3. c. 37), entitled, "An Act for draining and preserving certain Commons, Low Grounds, and Carrs, in the parish of Market Weighton, and other adjacent parishes in the East Riding of the County of York; and for making a navigable Cut or Canal, from Market Weighton to the River Humber." The act did not include powers to raise capital, as a group of people had agreed to finance the initial construction, while ongoing revenue was to be provided by a tax on landowners who benefited from the drainage and by the enclosing of common land, in addition to the normal tolls. The engineer appointed to oversee the work was a Mr. Whitworth, and was managed by a committee of drainage commissioners.

The canal was completed by 1782, and the main traffic consisted on agricultural produce and bricks, including Walling Fen bricks, which were fine, white and durable. Because of the dual purpose of drainage and navigation, water levels in relation to the land surface were strictly controlled by the terms of the enabling act. There was inevitable conflict between the two functions, with the navigation requiring higher water levels than the drainage functions required. A number of brickworks were established along the canal in the Newport area, and it was a commercial success.

=== Decline ===
Market Weighton Drainage Act 1900
- Act of Parliament
- Parliament of the United Kingdom
- Long title: An Act for incorporating and making better provisions for the meetings and proceedings of the Trustees of the Market Weighton Drainage and Canal in the East Riding of the County of York for better defining the lands subject to taxation by the said Trustees and making other provisions relative thereto for relieving the said Trustees from their obligations to maintain a part of the said canal for conferring further powers on the said Trustees and for other purposes.
- Citation: 63 & 64 Vict. c. ccxxxix
- Territorial extent: United Kingdom

Dates
- Royal assent: 6 August 1900
- Commencement: 6 August 1900 (Note: The Acts of Parliament (Commencement) Act 1793.)

Status: Current legislation

As with many others, the arrival of railways in the area started the decline of the canal. The York to Market Weighton Line opened in 1847, and the subsequent loss of income resulted in the condition of the canal deteriorating, to the extent that the commissioners sought an act of Parliament to abandon the canal as a navigation, which was granted in the Market Weighton Drainage Act 1900 (63 & 64 Vict. c. ccxxxix), and although the section above Sod House lock was abandoned in that year, the commercial carrying of bricks continued until the 1950s. This traffic was carried in Humber sloops. The condition of the canal continued to deteriorate until the formation of the Market Weighton Drainage Board in 1934, an internal drainage board under the terms of the Land Drainage Act 1930. They took over the powers of the original drainage commissioners, and are responsible for 113 miles (182 km) of arterial watercourses, most of which drain into the canal or the River Foulness, both of which came under the jurisdiction of the now defunct Yorkshire Ouse and Hull River Authority in 1951.

The lower section of the canal, including Weighton Lock, (also called Humber Lock), which provides access to the Humber Estuary, was abandoned in 1971, but when they heard that the lock was likely to be demolished, the Market Weighton Civic Trust moved quickly to have the whole structure listed as an ancient monument and their action, together with public pressure resulted in the lock being repaired and reopened. Further repairs and an overhaul of the structure were carried out in 1994 by the National Rivers Authority at a cost of £1.5 million, and although there is no public right of navigation on the waterway, access is possible by arrangement with the Environment Agency, who currently own it.

=== Drainage ===
During the 1960s, the area was affected by flooding, as a result of heavy rainfall, and the decision was taken to convert the River Foulness and the canal into a highland carrier drain. This involved raising the level of the banks, making the main channel wider and deeper, and creating storage areas for floodwater on both sides of the canal at Broomfleet. This work was undertaken by the river authority. The drainage board built six pumping stations between 1975 and 1979. Improvements to the drainage channels brought the cost up to £839,000, although 70% of this was provided by grants. In the 1980s, a £1 million scheme resulted in further improvements to the drainage works, and two more pumping stations were built, at Crabley and Skelfleet Cloughs.

When the Weighton Lock sluices were converted to electro-mechanical operation in 1971, water levels in the canal could be raised without adversely affecting the drainage functions. Around 80% of the water entering the catchment leaves it via the Weighton Lock sluice. Water in the north-west of the catchment flows into the River Foulness and the canal by gravity, whereas water in the south-east is managed by pumping stations, which pump into the canal. Two of the nine pumping stations operated by the drainage board pump directly into the Humber Estuary at Crabley Creek. The canal is tide-locked, as water levels in the Humber exceed those in the canal for much of the tide cycle, and water only drains out of the system at lower states of the tide. About half the drainage catchment lies below the level of high water on the Humber, and so the drainage function is vital to the livelihood of the area.

== The route ==
The navigation starts at Weighton Lock, which is bi-directional, due to the tidal range of the Humber Estuary. It crosses flat fenland to the north of the lock, passing under the Selby to Hull railway bridge and bridges carrying the B1230 road at Newport and the M62 motorway, which have restricted the headroom available for boats to about 9 feet (2.7 m). Above Sandholme Landing, the canal is joined by the River Foulness entering from the left, and about 1.2 miles (1.9 km) further on lies the derelict Sod House lock, the current head of navigation. Much of the canal beyond has been filled in, although drainage channels closely follow its route. There were two more locks, Mill lock and Holme Ings lock, and the canal terminated at Canal Head, about 0.6 miles (0.97 km) further on, and 2 miles (3.2 km) short of the town of Market Weighton. A short branch, the Holme Canal or Sir Edward Vavasour's Canal, turned off to the left immediately above Holme Ings lock, and remains in water. Above the junction with the River Foulness, the channel is heavily silted and navigation is difficult in all but the smallest boats.

== Points of interest ==
Point	Coordinates (Links to map resources)	OS Grid Ref	Notes
Canal Head terminus	53.8444°N 0.7022°W	SE854394	near Market Weighton
Jn with Holme Canal	53.8403°N 0.7082°W	SE851390	
Sod House lock	53.7989°N 0.7194°W	SE844343	
Jn with River Foulness	53.7823°N 0.7157°W	SE847325	
M62 motorway crossing	53.7683°N 0.7065°W	SE853309	
Selby - Hull railway bridge	53.7427°N 0.6900°W	SE864281	
Weighton lock	53.7201°N 0.6775°W	SE873256	Jn with Humber Estuary

== See also ==
- Canals of the United Kingdom
- History of the British canal system

== Bibliography ==
- Cumberlidge, Jane (1998). Inland Waterways of Great Britain (7th Ed.). Imray Laurie Norie and Wilson. ISBN 978-0-85288-355-6.
- Hadfield, Charles (1972). The Canals of Yorkshire and North East England (Vol 1). David and Charles. ISBN 978-0-7153-5719-4.
- Hadfield, Charles (1973). The Canals of Yorkshire and North East England (Vol 2). David and Charles. ISBN 978-0-7153-5975-4.
- Priestley, Joseph (1831). "Historical Account of the Navigable Rivers, Canals, and Railways of Great Britain". Archived from the original on 7 March 2016.
- Squires, Roger (2008). Britain's restored canals. Landmark Publishing. ISBN 978-1-84306-331-5.
