= River Foulness =

River in the East Riding of Yorkshire, England

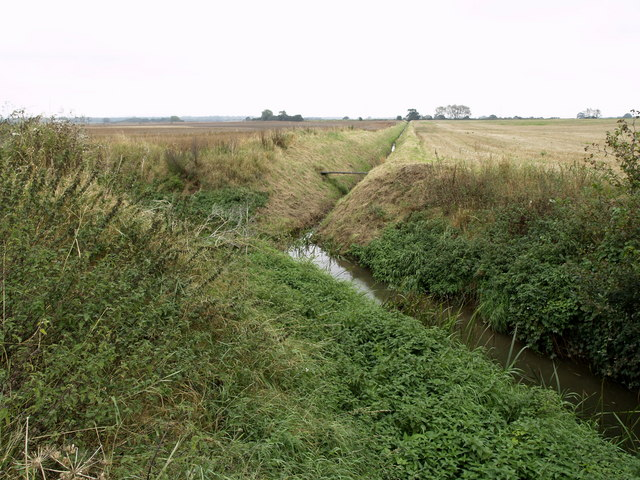
- River Foulness near Seaton Ross; 53°50′51″N 0°47′51″W

Location
- Country: England

Physical characteristics
- Source
  - location: Shiptonthorpe
  - coordinates: 53°53′8″N 0°42′39″W
  - elevation: 20 metres (66 ft)
- Mouth
  - location: Market Weighton Canal
  - coordinates: 53°46′56″N 0°42′57″W
  - elevation: 1 metre (3.3 ft)
- Length: 15.85 mi (25.51 km)

The River Foulness is a river in the East Riding of Yorkshire, England. Its name is derived from Old English fūle[n] ēa, meaning “dirty water”. Maintenance responsibilities for the river transferred from the Environment Agency to the Market Weighton Drainage Board on 1 October 2011. Market Weighton Drainage Board subsequently amalgamated with the Lower Ouse Internal Drainage Board on 1 April 2012 to create the Ouse and Humber Drainage Board. The river discharges into the Humber Estuary via Market Weighton Canal. Water levels within the river, its tributaries and the canal are managed and controlled by the Environment Agency. The river lies in an area known as the Humberhead Levels.

== Course ==
The river rises as a series of drains in the fields to the north-west of the village of Shiptonthorpe, which is close to the town of Market Weighton. It passes under Clayfield Lane, where the former York to Market Weighton line also crossed. The station immediately to the north of the crossing was called Londesborough, rather than Shiptonthorpe, and opened in 1847. The line was recommended for closure in the Beeching report of 1963 and closed in November 1965. The stream flows southwards along the eastern boundary of Shiptonthorpe, and is joined by East Beck which rises to the north-east in Londesborough. Below the junction it is crossed by the A1079 road at Shipton Bridge. Whereas it has previously been named Drain on the Ordnance Survey (OS) maps, it now becomes the River Foulness or Shipton Beck. It continues in a broadly south-westerly direction, and is joined by Skelfrey Beck, which flows westwards from Market Weighton. From this point onwards, it is called the River Foulness and is managed by the Ouse and Humber Drainage Board, an Internal drainage board (IDB) which is responsible for land drainage in the district, and maintains many drains which feed into the river. At Harswell, the river is crossed by Harswell Bridge, and is then joined by two drains. Many of the drains have alternative names, as the Ordnance Survey calls them Fox Drain and Eller Ings Dyke, whereas the IDB call them Acre Drain and Castle Eller Drain.

To the north-west of Holme-on-Spalding-Moor it is joined by Black Dike (OS) or Lowmath Drain (IDB), flowing from the east, and then by Black Beck (OS) or Seaton Main Drain (IDB). As it approaches the former Selby and Market Weighton Railway, the river used to meander to the south of the formation, but a new channel was cut running along the northern edge of the railway embankment, which was subsequently extended almost to Foulness Bridge, where the river flows under the railway. The station to serve Holme-on-Spalding-Moor was further to the east, and was called Holme (Yorks) when it opened in 1848, but was renamed Holme Moor in 1923, and closed in 1954. The trackbed is now a public footpath from the River Derwent to the A614 road. After closure, Foulness railway bridge was replaced by a wooded footbridge. The sewage treatment works for Holme-on-Spalding-Moor is located to the west of the settlement, on the south side of the railway embankment, and the treated effluent discharges into the river to the north of the embankment, via Main Drain. Wood Dike flows southwards and then eastwards, and also passes under to railway to join the Foulness. Just to the south of the junction, the river is crossed by the A163 at Major Bridge. It continues to the south and then the east, to be joined on its right bank by four more drains, Foss Dike, Seller Dike, Londesborough Drain and Great Committee Drain, before it reaches the hamlet of Welhambridge. Here there are two bridges, the first following the original course of the A614 road and the second a newer bypass.

Once past Welhambridge, Dunn's Drain joins on the left bank, and Featherbed Drain or Commonend Drain joins on the right, to the south-west of the hamlet of Bursea. Bishopsoil Drain or Carr Drain runs parallel to Featherbed Drain for much of its length, but near the Foulness turns to the east and runs parallel to the river before joining it further downstream. Just before it reaches the Market Weighton Canal, a short drain is pumped into the river by the Hasholme pumping station. The river joins the canal below Sod House Lock, and to the north of the M62 motorway bridge. Between the junction and the motorway are a group of farms, which are called North America by the Ordnance Survey.

== Environment ==
The Environment Agency measure the water quality of the river systems in England. Each is given an overall ecological status, which may be one of five levels: high, good, moderate, poor and bad. There are several components that are used to determine this, including biological status, which looks at the quantity and varieties of invertebrates, angiosperms and fish. Chemical status, which compares the concentrations of various chemicals against known safe concentrations, is rated good or fail.

The water quality of the River Foulness system was as follows in 2019.

Section	Ecological Status	Chemical Status	Overall Status	Length	Catchment	Channel
Foulness from Source to Black Beck (South)	Moderate	Fail	Moderate	7.9 miles (12.7 km)	12.90 square miles (33.4 km^{2})	heavily modified
Foulness from Black Beck to Market Weighton Canal	Moderate	Fail	Moderate	27.5 miles (44.3 km)	77.88 square miles (201.7 km^{2})	

The upper river has not been classed as good quality because the dissolved oxygen content is poor, which may be due to faulty data. This also affects the lower river, where water quality is further reduced by poor management of nutrients, discharges from septic tanks and discharges from industry. The data for "Foulness from Black Beck to Market Weighton Canal" includes the channels of Black Dike, Foss Dyke, and the Market Weighton Canal above the junction with the Foulness. Like many rivers in the UK, the chemical status changed from good to fail in 2019, due to the presence of polybrominated diphenyl ethers (PBDE) and mercury compounds, neither of which had previously been included in the assessment.

== Natural history ==
The majority of the area is agricultural farmland with large rectangular fields bounded by hedgerows, mainly composed of hawthorn but also including blackthorn, dog rose, elder and hazel. There are very few areas of woodland. Wildlife surveys of the river show evidence of European water vole, European otter, freshwater mussel and many amphibians. Water voles tend to inhabit the drains rather than the main river, although they do occasionally venture into it.

Much of the farmland within the river catchment is registered as part of the Environmental Stewardship programme, which encourages good environmental practice in farming, with a significant proportion of that in the Higher Level Stewardship category. Within the Humberhead Levels, this scheme aims to increase populations of farmland birds, and to provide habitat for the breeding and overwintering of wading birds. The scheme has been run in conjunction with the Royal Society for the Protection of Birds (RSPB) and the Yorkshire Wildlife Trust. The area is now noted for its red list farmyard birds, species which are at risk on a global, European or British level.

== Geology ==
The river runs through an area where the underlying geology consists of Mercia Mudstone to the east and Sherwood Sandstone, dating from the Triassic period, to the west. This was largely covered by glacial deposits during the Devensian period, when most of the landscape was submerged beneath the waters of Lake Humber. Along the course of the river, more recent alluvial deposits are found.

The upper reaches of the river are located just to the west of the Yorkshire Wolds, a large aquifer composed of chalk, from which springs emerge to supply much of the base flow of the waterway. This flow is supplemented by a large number of surface drainage ditches, which were cut to improve the land for agriculture. As a result, flows in the river vary significantly depending on the amount of rainfall. The Black Dike and Black Beck tributaries augment the flows in the upper reaches. Further downstream, the river flows over several soil types including Loam, Sand and Alluvium. There are over 75 miles (121 km) of drainage ditches that feed into the river, but few natural tributaries.

Much of the upper river has been heavily modified over the centuries, and the water can become brown in colour, due to the presence of ferrous oxides in the subsoil over which the river flows. Any disturbance of this compound which results in its exposure to air, such as during weed cutting, results in it changing to ferric oxide, which is insoluble, and causes the discolouration. This can be particularly noticeable near Major Bridge.

== History ==
The river has been variously known as the Foona, the Fulnath when the Commission of Sewers reported in 1323, the Foonah in a poem about the witches of Wallingfen, the Foulney when a survey of the drainage of the area was conducted in 1664, and the Foulness more recently. It is the main source of natural drainage in the Vale of York, an area to the west of the Yorkshire Wolds, the southern part of which was known as Houghdenshire when John Leland conducted his survey of England in the 16th century, and Howdenshire subsequently. Most of the Vale of York is less than 33 feet (10 m) above ordnance datum, with the main exception being Holme-on-Spalding-Moor, which rises to 130 feet (40 m). At its southern edge, the area borders the Humber, which has a tidal range of 24 feet (7.2 m).

The river valley has been populated since Palaeolithic times with many artefacts from that age being unearthed by archeologists. Remains from Mesolithic, Neolithic, Bronze Age, Iron Age and Roman times have also been found by various digs in the area. Much of the area was marshland at the time, interspersed with deposits of sand and gravel, which provided locations for the prehistoric settlements. Areas which have been particularly productive for prehistoric finds are near the river between Hasholme and Welham Bridge on the lower river, and near Shiptonthorpe on the upper river. Evidence of Roman settlement has also been found in the river valley, together with villas and kilns used for the production of pottery. Evidence from Saxon times is scant, but the medieval period is represented by historic villages with associated field systems, and turbaries where peat was cut for fuel. Evidence of the 17th century drainers can be seen in the many dykes, drains, bridges, sluices and pumphouses that are a feature of the landscape.

The area has become known as the "Valley of the first iron masters", because of extensive iron works dating from the prehistoric period. The location of such remains has been clarified by Hull University, who have been carrying out a landscape archaeology project since 1980. This has concentrated on mapping Iron Age and Roman sites, and has led to the discovery of more iron working sites along the river. A prehistoric log boat was found at Hasholme in 1984, and after excavation and conservation, is on public display at the Hull and East Riding Museum. Prior to the construction of the Market Weighton Canal, the River Foulness continued to flow southwards through Newport and then into Wallingfen, some 5,000 acres (2,000 ha) of marshy ground, where the course of the river could not be discerned. When the canal was built, it used one of the drains in the area to cross the fen, and most of the flow of the river was diverted into it.

During the 1960s, localised flooding caused by heavy rain occurred in several places within the catchment of the river and canal, and the solution suggested was to turn both into highland carriers. This involved raising the height of the banks and increasing the depth and width of the channels. Management of water levels within the system is controlled by Weighton Lock, which connects the Market Weighton Canal to the Humber, and the use of it in this way was one of the main factors that led to the withdrawal of the right of navigation on the canal in 1971.

== Leisure ==
There are very few Public Rights of Way in the river valley. It is not crossed by many roads and there are few major settlements; therefore, leisure activity is limited mainly to angling. Species which can be caught in the lower river include bream, tench, roach, rudd and perch, with pike during the winter months. The river is not ideal for fishing, due to its steep banks in many places, and weed growth can be a problem during the summer. Good catches are more likely during dry, mild weather. The drainage board generally cut the weed in the autumn, and this again causes problems for anglers, until the weed is flushed downstream and out into the Humber.

== Lists ==
=== Tributaries ===
- East Beck, Shiptonthorpe
- Skelfrey Beck
- Black Dike
- Over 75 miles (121 km) of drainage channels and small watercourses

=== Settlements ===
- Shiptonthorpe
- Harswell
- Holme-on-Spalding-Moor
- Welham Bridge
- Bursea
- Spaldington

=== Crossings ===
- Clayfield Lane, Shiptonthorpe
- A1079 Shipton Bridge, Shiptonthorpe
- Harswell Bridge (Bull Lane), Harswell
- Carr Bridge (footpath)
- Foxcarr Bridge (footpath)
- Minor road bridge, Seaton New Hall
- Foulness Bridge (footpath)
- Major Bridge, A163 Selby Road, near Holme-on-Spalding-Moor
- Welham Bridge (Minor Road) and A614 (Major Road)

== Bibliography ==
- Butt, R. V. J. (October 1995). The Directory of Railway Stations: details every public and private passenger station, halt, platform and stopping place, past and present (1st ed.). Sparkford: Patrick Stephens Ltd. ISBN 978-1-85260-508-7. OCLC 60251199. OL 11956311M.
- CaBA (March 2017). "Hull and East Riding Catchment Plan" (PDF). Catchment Based Approach. Archived (PDF) from the original on 27 July 2021.
- Planning Co (September 2012). "Market Weighton Canal and River Foulness Action Plan". Rural Programmes S East Yorkshire. Archived from the original on 28 July 2021.
- Waundby, John Neville (2012). Market Weighton and Wallingfen Drainage - A History of the Market Weighton Drainage Board. Ouse and Humber Drainage Board.

=== References ===
- Media related to River Foulness at Wikimedia Commons
