= Michael Stanhope (courtier) =

English knight (1508–1552)

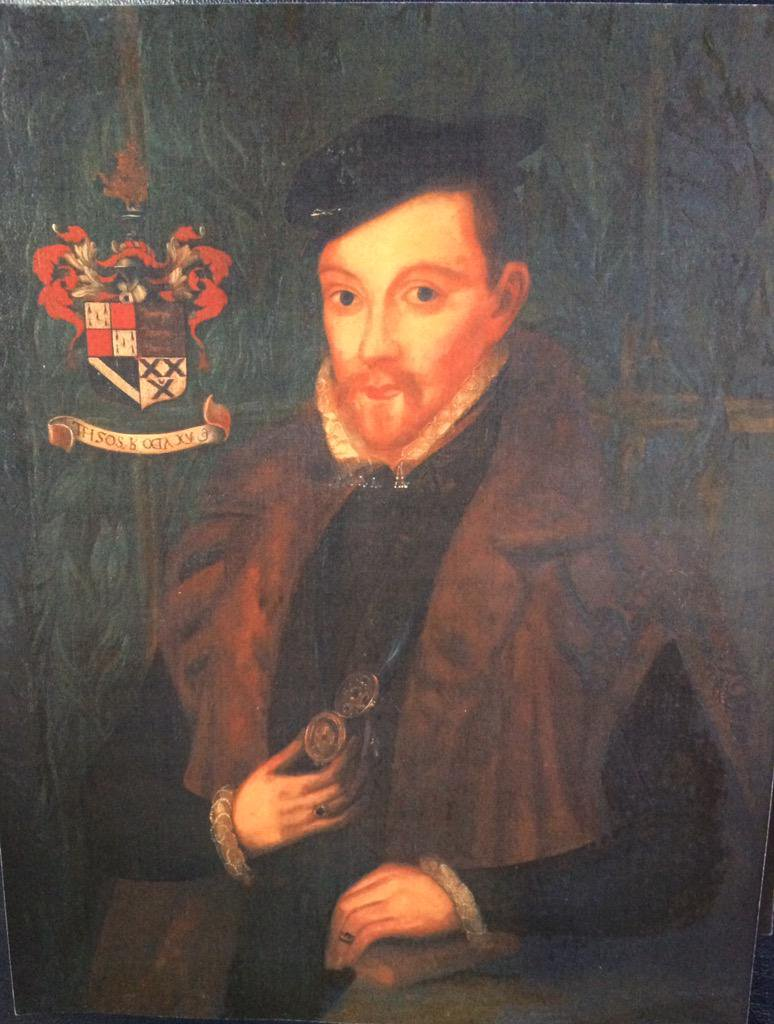
Portrait of Sir Michael Stanhope

Arms of Stanhope: Quarterly ermine and gules

Sir Michael Stanhope (before 1508 – 26 February 1552) of Shelford in Nottinghamshire, was an influential courtier who was beheaded on Tower Hill, having been convicted of conspiring to assassinate John Dudley, 1st Duke of Northumberland, and others.

== Origins ==
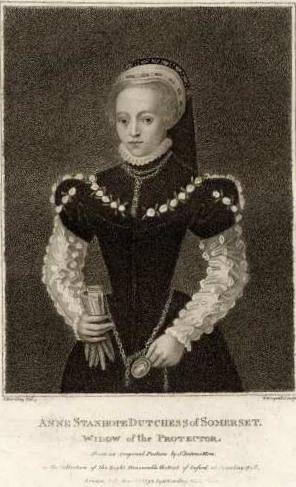
Anne Stanhope, half sister of Sir Michael Stanhope and wife of Edward Seymour, 1st Duke of Somerset

He was born before 1508, the second son of Sir Edward Stanhope (d. 6 June 1511) of Rampton in Nottinghamshire, by his first wife Adelina Clifton, a daughter of Sir Gervase Clifton of Clifton in Nottinghamshire. The Stanhopes were an ancient Nottinghamshire family and Sir Edward Stanhope fought at the Battle of Stoke in 1487 and, in 1497, at the Battle of Blackheath, where he was knighted on the field for his valour. He was a Knight of the Body and Constable of Sandal Castle.

Sir Edward Stanhope married secondly (as her third husband) Elizabeth Bourchier (d. 1557) a daughter of Fulk Bourchier, 10th Baron FitzWarin (1445–1479), by whom he had an only daughter Anne Stanhope (c. 1510–1587), Sir Michael Stanhope's half-sister and the wife of Edward Seymour, 1st Duke of Somerset, eldest brother of Queen Jane Seymour

== Career ==
In 1529, following the death of his elder brother, Richard Stanhope (d. 21 January 1529), without male issue, Michael Stanhope succeeded to some of the family estates, excluding the paternal seat of Rampton which descended to his only daughter and heiress Saunchia Stanhope, the wife of John Babington. By 1532 he was in the service of Thomas Manners, 1st Earl of Rutland. By 1535 Stanhope's half sister, Anne Stanhope, had married Edward Seymour, 1st Duke of Somerset, the eldest brother of Queen Jane Seymour, third wife of King Henry VIII, and thus Stanhope entered the King's service.

In October 1536 he helped to prevent the spread of the Pilgrimage of Grace rebellion and was rewarded with an appointment as a Justice of the Peace for Nottinghamshire, and the opportunity to acquire from the Crown lands in Nottinghamshire which became available following the dissolution of the monasteries. He purchased Shelford Priory in November 1537, leased Lenton Priory in 1539, and in 1540 purchased the manor of Shelford and other properties.

By 1538 Stanhope held a position as an officer in the royal stables, and by 1540 was one of Henry VIII's Esquires of the Body.

In the early 1540s Stanhope held several offices in Yorkshire, and by September 1544 had been appointed lieutenant of the garrison at Kingston upon Hull, an appointment which he likely owed to the influence of his brother-in-law, Seymour, then Earl of Hertford. His responsibilities as lieutenant, and later as governor, included the supply of provisions, men and ships for Berwick and for English campaigns on the Scottish border and into Scotland itself. In 1546 he was in conflict with the townsmen of Hull, who complained to the Privy Council of his high-handedness, while he in turn complained of their "lewd behaviour".

Stanhope was knighted in about 1545 and was twice elected as a Member of Parliament for the prestigious county seat of Nottinghamshire, in 1545 and 1547.

In 1547 King Edward VI acceded to the throne, and the young King's uncle and Stanhope's brother-in-law, Edward Seymour, was created Duke of Somerset and was appointed Lord Protector. Stanhope's own career reached its apex at this point. He was appointed Groom of the Stool to the new king, an appointment which effectively placed him in control of the King's privy purse, and 'was recognised as the leading figure in the royal entourage'. He was Master of the King's Harriers in July 1548, and by 1549 was Chief Gentleman of the Privy Chamber. At about this time he purchased further former chantry lands, chiefly in Yorkshire.

In 1549 Somerset fell from power, and on 12 October 1549 Stanhope lost his own appointments and was imprisoned in the Tower of London. The Privy Council ordered his release on 17 February 1550, but the order was reversed the following day. On 22 February Stanhope signed a recognizance of £3,000, and was granted his freedom. In early 1551 he was re-appointed to the governorship of Kingston upon Hull, and again came into conflict with the local authorities. On 18 May 1551 he was released from the recognizance.

=== Execution ===
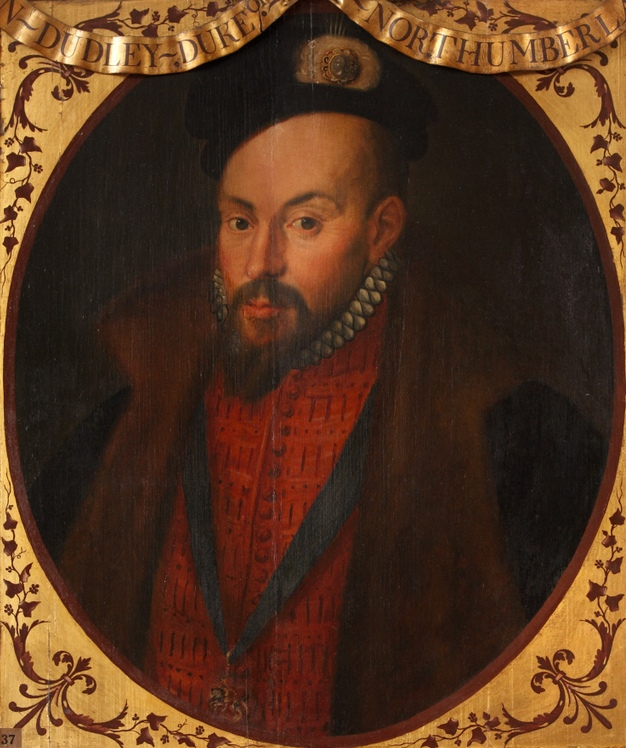
John Dudley, 1st Duke of Northumberland, whom Sir Michael Stanhope was convicted of conspiring to kill

On 17 October 1551 he was again sent to the Tower, this time on a charge of involvement with Somerset in a conspiracy to assassinate John Dudley, 1st Duke of Northumberland, and others. Somerset was beheaded on Tower Hill on 22 January 1552, and on 27 January Stanhope was put on trial for having "feloniously instigated Somerset to insurrection", and for "holding rebellious assemblies, for the purpose of taking, imprisoning and murdering" John Dudley, 1st Duke of Northumberland, William Parr, 1st Marquess of Northampton, and William Herbert, 1st Earl of Pembroke, 'apparently under the act passed by Northumberland's influence in the parliament of 1549–50'. According to Pollard, "Stanhope was no doubt implicated in Somerset's endeavours to supplant Northumberland, but there is no evidence that he aimed at taking the Duke's life".

Stanhope was convicted, and was initially condemned to death by hanging. However the sentence of hanging was commuted to a more honourable form of execution and he was beheaded on Tower Hill on 26 February 1552, "stoutly maintaining his innocence". His attainder was confirmed by an Act of Parliament passed on 12 April 1552. The attainder was reversed early in the reign of Queen Mary I, at which time his eldest son and heir, Sir Thomas Stanhope, recovered possession of his paternal estates.

Stanhope's alleged co-conspirators, Sir Thomas Arundell of Wardour, Sir Miles Partridge and Sir Ralph Vane, were all executed on the same day, Arundell being beheaded, Partridge and Vane hanged.

== Marriage and children ==
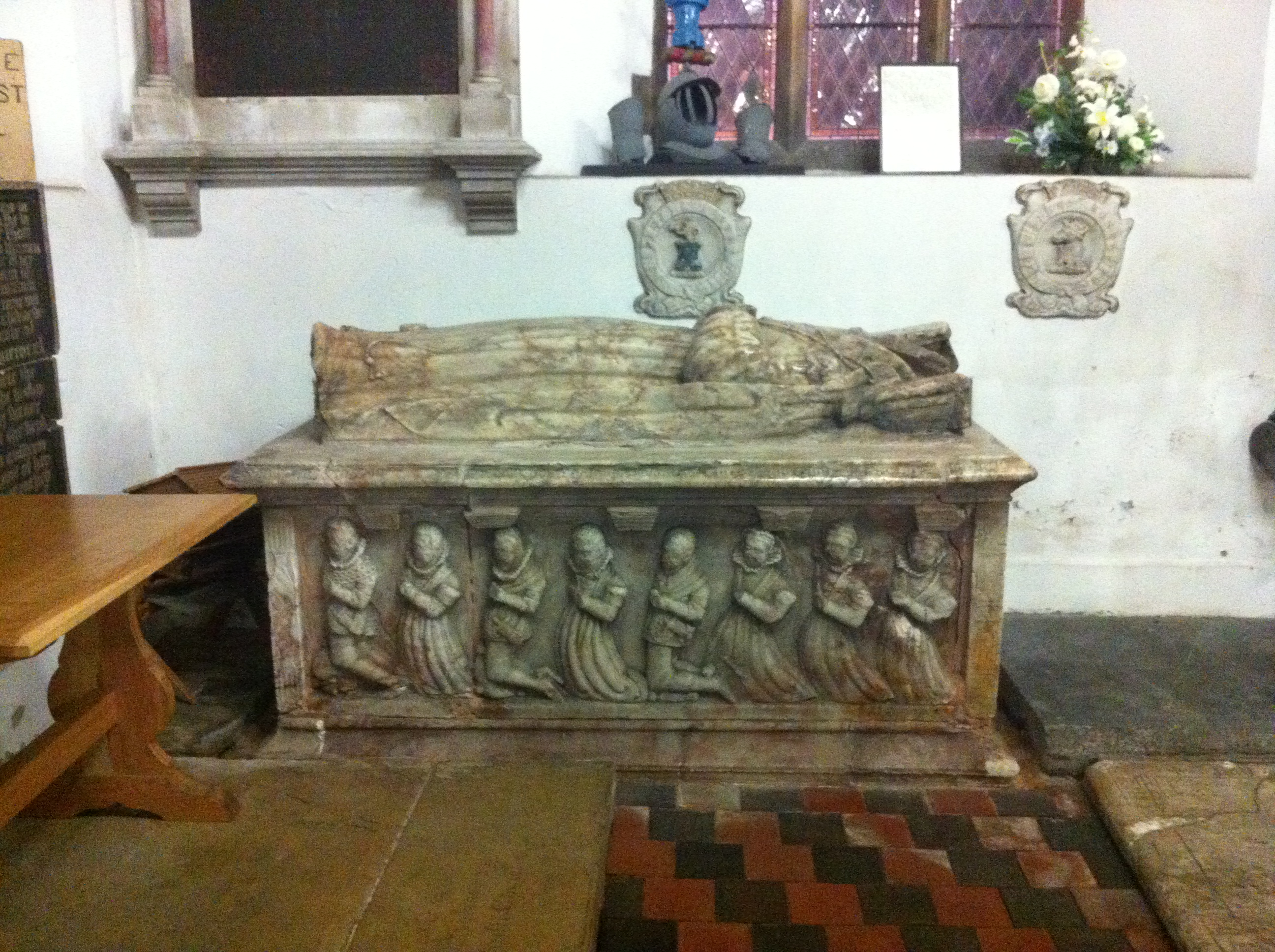
Chest tomb and effigy of Anne Rawson, wife of Sir Michael Stanhope, in the Stanhope Chapel in St. Peter and St. Paul's Church, Shelford, Nottinghamshire

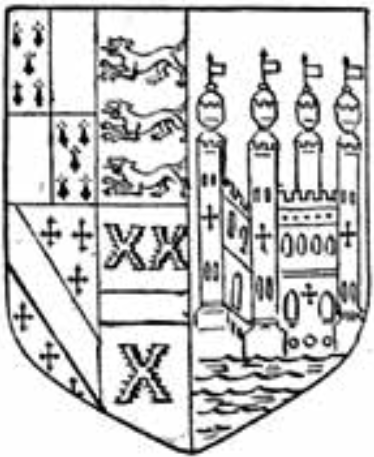
Drawing of heraldic shield at end of chest tomb of Anne Rawson, showing arms of Stanhope (of four quarters) impaling Rawson: Gules, a four square castle in perspective with as many towers and cupolas one at each angle or standing in water azure

At some time before November 1537, Stanhope married Anne Rawson (c. 1515 – 20 February 1588), a daughter of Nicholas Rawson of Aveley in Essex, by his wife Beatrix Cooke (d. 14 January 1554), a daughter of Sir Philip Cooke (d. 7 December 1503) by his wife Elizabeth Belknap (died c. 6 March 1504). Beatrix was the aunt of Sir Anthony Cooke. By his wife he had seven sons and four daughters as follows, as recorded in the inscription on her monument in St. Peter and St. Paul's Church, Shelford:

- Sir Thomas Stanhope (1540 – 3 August 1596) of Shelford, Nottinghamshire, eldest son and heir, who married Margaret Port, a daughter and co-heiress of Sir Sir John Port (d. 1557) of Etwall in Derbyshire.
- Sir Edward Stanhope (c. 1543–1603), a member of the Council of the North of Queen Elizabeth I . He married Susan Coleshill, the daughter and heiress of Thomas Coleshill (d.1595) of Chigwell in Essex, Inspector of Customs for the City of London, by whom he had several sons and daughters, including a daughter who married Sir Percival Hart, MP.
- John Stanhope, 1st Baron Stanhope of Harrington, Vice-Chamberlain of the Household, elevated to the peerage by King James I. The title became extinct in 1675 on the death of his only son.
- Edward Stanhope (c. 1546–1608), a Doctor of Civil Law and a Master of the Court of Chancery.
- Sir Michael Stanhope of Sudbourne in Suffolk, one of the Gentlemen of the Privy Chamber to Queen Elizabeth I. He was knighted in 1603 by King James I. He married Elizabeth Read, a daughter of Sir William Read of Osterley in Middlesex, by whom he had two daughters and co-heiresses. His monument survives in Sudbourne Church.
- William Stanhope, died an infant.
- Edward Stanhope, died an infant.
- Eleanor Stanhope, who married Thomas Cooper of Thurgarton in Nottinghamshire.
- Juliana Stanhope, who married John Hotham (died c. 1609) of Scorborough in Yorkshire.
- Jane Stanhope, who married firstly Sir Roger Townshend (d.1590), and secondly (as his second wife) Henry Berkeley, 7th Baron Berkeley.
- Margaret Stanhope, died an infant.

== Notes ==
Political offices
Preceded by John Hercy; Gervase Clifton	Member of Parliament for Nottinghamshire; 1545–1549; With: Sir Anthony Neville (1545-1546); Sir John Markham (1547-1553)	Succeeded by William Mering; George Lascelles (MP)
Honorary titles
Preceded by Sir Anthony Browne	Lieutenant and Keeper of Hampton Court Chase, Ranger of Bushy Park; 1548–October 1549	Succeeded by William Parr, 1st Marquis of Northampton
