= Arthur Stanhope =

English politician

Arthur Stanhope (1627 – 26 March 1694) was an English politician who sat in the House of Commons between 1660 and 1679.

== Life ==
Stanhope was born at Shelford, Mansfield Woodhouse, Nottinghamshire, the son of Philip Stanhope, 1st Earl of Chesterfield and his wife Catherine Hastings, daughter of Francis Hastings, Lord Hastings and was baptised on 10 April 1627. He entered Gray's Inn in 1642. Three older brothers were killed on the Royalist side in the English Civil War but he tended to support the parliamentary party. He lived at Shelford Manor which was badly damaged in 1660 when the disintegrating Commonwealth army attacked Nottingham.

In 1660, with his uncle and friend Colonel John Hutchinson, Stanhope was elected Member of Parliament for Nottingham in the Convention Parliament. He was re-elected MP for Nottingham in 1661 for the Cavalier Parliament.

Stanhope died at the age of about 66 and was buried at Shelford.

== Family ==
Stanhope married Anne Salusbury, daughter of Sir Henry Salusbury, 1st Baronet, the first of the Salusbury Baronets of Lleweni (1619) with whom he had four children.

- Philip Stanhope born 1653, died 1670
- Henry Stanhope born 1654, died 1665
- Charles Stanhope born 1655, died 1712, ancestor of the fifth Earl and succeeding earls of Chesterfield
- Catherine Stanhope born 1657, died 1705

== Ancestry ==
Ancestors of Arthur Stanhope

16. Sir Michael Stanhope
8. Sir Thomas Stanhope
17. Ann Rawson
4. Sir John Stanhope
18&26. John Port (the younger)
9. Margaret Port
19&27. Elizabeth Giffard
2. Philip Stanhope, 1st Earl of Chesterfield
20. Giles Allington
10. Richard Allington
21. Alice Middleton
5. Cordell Allington
22. John Cordell
11. Joan Cordell
23. Emma Webb
1. Arthur Stanhope
24. Francis Hastings, 2nd Earl of Huntingdon
12. George Hastings, 4th Earl of Huntingdon
25. Catherine Pole
6. Francis Hastings, Baron Hastings
26&18. John Port (the younger)
13. Dorothy Port
27&19. Elizabeth Giffard
3. Katherine Hastings
28. John Harrington
14. James Harrington
29. Elizabeth Moton
7. Sarah Harrington
30. William Sydney
15. Lucy Sidney
31. Anne Pakenham
