= John Port =

John Port may refer to:

- Sir John Port (judge) (1480–1541), judge, born in Chester, lived in Etwall, Derbyshire, England
- Sir John Port (died 1557), son of above, born in Etwall, founded Repton School

== See also ==
- John Port Spencer Academy in Etwall, Derbyshire
