= Thomas Stanhope =

Member of the Parliament of England

Sir Thomas Stanhope
- Born: c. 1540
- Died: 3 August 1596
- Spouse: Margaret Port
- Issue: Sir John Stanhope; Edward Stanhope; Anne Stanhope
- Father: Sir Michael Stanhope
- Mother: Anne Rawson

Sir Thomas Stanhope (c. 1540 – 3 August 1596) was the son and heir of Sir Michael Stanhope, and a Member of Parliament for Nottinghamshire.

== Family ==
Thomas Stanhope was the eldest son of Sir Michael Stanhope and Anne Rawson (c.1515 – 20 February 1588), the daughter of Nicholas Rawson, of Aveley, Essex, and Beatrix Cooke (d. 14 January 1554), daughter of Sir Philip Cooke (d. 7 December 1503) and Elizabeth Belknap (died c. 6 March 1504),

He had six brothers and four sisters, as recorded in the inscription on his mother's monument in Shelford church:

- Sir Edward Stanhope (c.1543–1603), a member of Queen Elizabeth's Council of the North. He married Susan Coleshill, the daughter and heir of Thomas Coleshill (d.1595), esquire, of Chigwell, Essex, inspector of customs for the City of London, by whom he had several sons and daughters, including a daughter who married Sir Percival Hart.
- John Stanhope, 1st Baron Stanhope, Vice-Chamberlain of the Household, created Baron Stanhope of Harrington by King James. The title became extinct in 1675 with the death of his only son.
- Edward Stanhope (c.1546–1608), Doctor of Civil Law and a Master of the Court of Chancery.
- Sir Michael Stanhope of Sudbourne near Woodbridge, Suffolk, one of Queen Elizabeth's Gentlemen of the Privy Chamber. He was knighted in 1603 by King James. He married Elizabeth Read, the daughter of Sir William Read of Osterley, Middlesex, by whom he had two daughters and coheirs. There is a monument to him in Sudbourne church.
- William Stanhope, who died an infant.
- Edward Stanhope, who died an infant.
- Eleanor Stanhope, who married Thomas Cooper of Thurgarton, Nottinghamshire.
- Juliana Stanhope, who married John Hotham, esquire, of Scarborough, Yorkshire.
- Jane Stanhope, who married firstly Sir Roger Townshend, and secondly, as his second wife, Henry Berkeley, 7th Baron Berkeley.
- Margaret Stanhope, who died an infant.

== Career ==
Stanhope was twelve years old when his father was executed in 1552. He lived at Shelford Priory Nottinghamshire.

In 1562 he was appointed Sheriff of Nottinghamshire and Derbyshire and in 1574 and 1587 High Sheriff of Nottinghamshire. In 1586 and 1593 he was elected knight of the shire (MP) for Nottinghamshire. He was knighted in 1575.

In 1596 he died in debt, partly caused by the cost of rebuilding Shelford Priory.

== Marriage and issue ==
Stanhope married Margaret Port, the daughter of Sir John Port of Etwall and Cubley, Derbyshire, by Elizabeth Gifford.

Children:

- Sir John Stanhope (1559-1611), who married firstly, Cordell Alington, and secondly, Catherine Trentham.
- Edward Stanhope.
- Anne Stanhope (1576–1651), who married John Holles, 1st Earl of Clare (d.1637), the son of Denzel Holles (1538?–1590) and Eleanor Sheffield, daughter of Edmund Sheffield, 1st Baron Sheffield.
