= Sir John Stanhope =

English knight and landowner

Sir John Stanhope (1559 – 1611) was an English knight and landowner, and father of Philip Stanhope, 1st Earl of Chesterfield.

== Career ==
John Stanhope was the son of Sir Thomas Stanhope (d. 1596) of Shelford Manor, Nottinghamshire, and Margaret Port, the daughter of Sir John Port of Etwall, Derbyshire, and Elizabeth Giffard.

Charles Cavendish had a feud with the Stanhope family over issues including a fish weir in the River Trent. He arranged to fight a duel with John Stanhope at Lambeth choosing rapiers as the weapon. They came to Lambeth bridge by boat. It was discovered that Stanhope was wearing a sword-proof padded doublet. The fight was called off. In November 1599 Cavendish was shot in the backside by Stanhope's followers while visiting Kirkby Hardwick.

== Marriages and family ==
Stanhope married firstly, Cordelia Alington, with whom he had his eldest son and heir, Philip Stanhope, 1st Earl of Chesterfield (d.1656).

Stanhope married secondly, Catherine Trentham (1566–1621). Their children included:

- John (died 29 May 1638), later Sir, High Sheriff of Derbyshire in 1629. Married Mary Radcliffe. He was granted Elvaston Castle and its estate, which had once belonged to the dissolved Shelford Priory, by his father. He was the great-grandfather of the 1st Earl of Harrington.
- Cordelia (1585 – buried 2 October 1639), married first Sir Roger Aston (died 1612) of Cranford, married second John Mohun, 1st Baron Mohun of Okehampton
- Jane (1606–1683), married first Sir Peter Courten, 1st Baronet, and married second Francis Annesley, 1st Viscount Valentia, by whom she had nine children, died 1683/4, buried in the chancel of St. Mary's Church, Nottingham
- Catherine (1610–1694), married in 1631 to Sir Thomas Hutchinson (MP). They had three children; Charles Hutchinson, M.P. for Nottingham, Stanhope Hutchinson, and Isabella Hutchinson who married Charles Cotton.
- Anne or Anna Katherine (1593–1637), who married Thomas Cokain around the year 1607, and was the mother of the author Aston Cockain or Cockayne. As "Mrs Cokain", she was a correspondent of the poet John Donne.
- Dorothy (1595–1647)
- Thomas died at birth 1592-1592
