= Etwall Hospital =

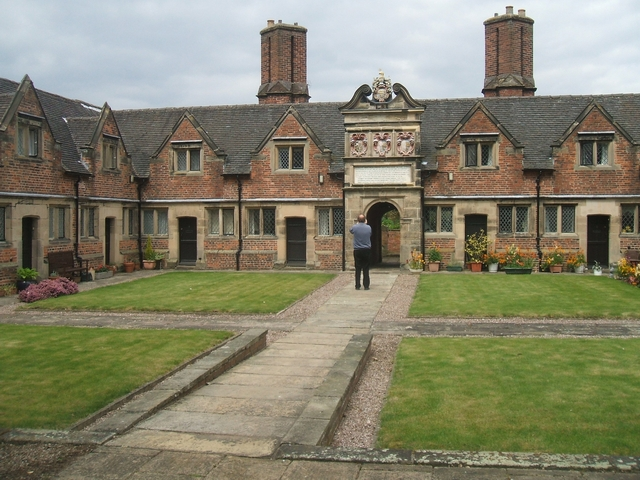
- Etwall Hospital

- Shown in Derbyshire

Geography
- Location: Etwall, Derbyshire, England, United Kingdom
- Coordinates: 52.8852°N 1.6024°W

Organisation
- Care system: Public NHS
- Type: Rehabilitation

Services
- Emergency department: No Accident & Emergency

History
- Founded: 1556
- Closed: 1980

Links
- Lists: Hospitals in England

Etwall Hospital was a 94-bed rehabilitation centre in Etwall, Derbyshire, England.

== History ==
The hospital was built around almshouses for six poor males endowed by Sir John Port in 1556. The number of poor males which could be accommodated was increased to twelve in 1622. The 'Hospital' was run as a charity by a corporation and a resident Master. The modern hospital, which started life as an isolation unit in 1902, was by 1949 in use as a rehabilitation centre. By 1979, it was catering for the young chronic sick and geriatric patients and the terminally ill, as well as those recovering from accidents and serious operations run by Derbyshire Area Health Authority.

The decision to close the hospital was resisted by the Etwall Community Action Group and was supported by the staff who led a work-in until March 1980.
