= Anthony Browne (died 1548) =

English politician and nobleman

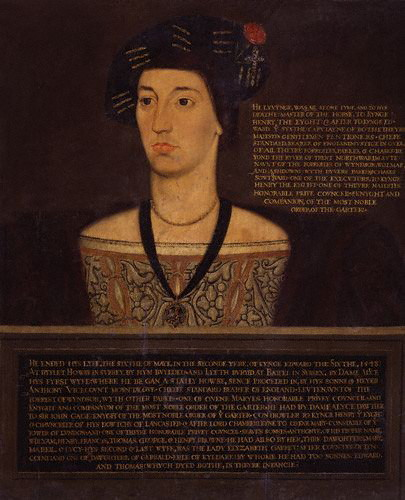
Sir Anthony Browne, wearing the Great George badge of the Order of the Garter. National Portrait Gallery, London

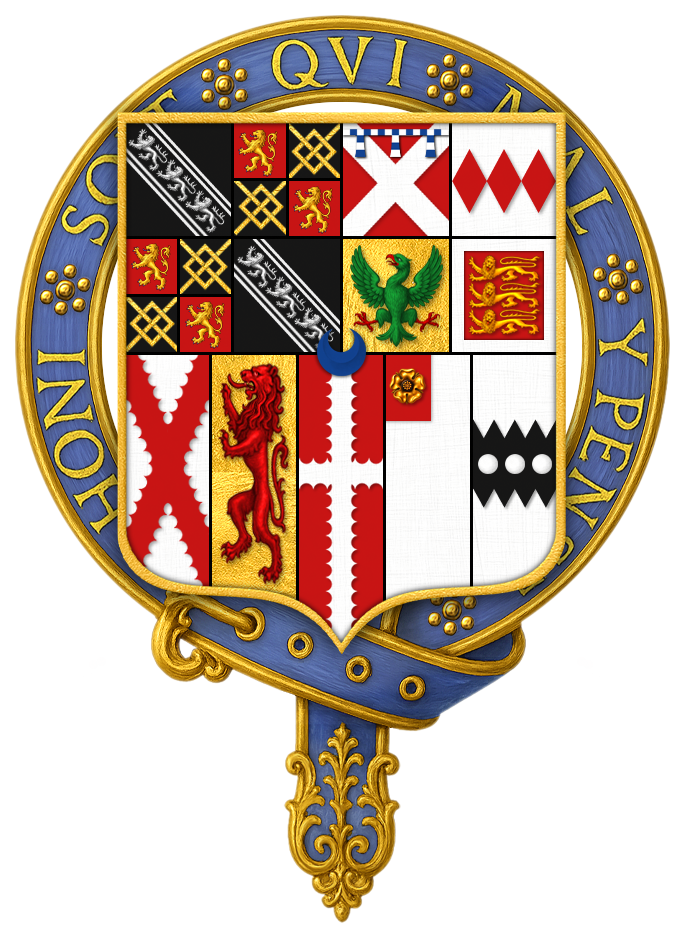
Arms of Sir Anthony Browne, KG

Sir Anthony Browne, KG (c. 1500 – 6 May 1548) of Battle Abbey and Cowdray Park, both in Sussex, England, was a Member of Parliament and a courtier who served as Master of the Horse to King Henry VIII.

== Origins ==
He was the son and heir of Sir Anthony Browne (died 1506) "the Elder", Standard Bearer of England and Governor of Queenborough Castle in Kent, by his wife Lucy Neville, a daughter of John Neville, 1st Marquess of Montagu and Isabel Ingoldisthorpe. Lucy was also the granddaughter of Richard Neville, 5th Earl of Salisbury, and the niece of Richard Neville, Earl of Warwick, the "Kingmaker". Before marrying Browne, Lucy had been the widow of Sir Thomas Fitzwilliam of Aldwark, the younger Anthony was, therefore, a younger half-brother of William Fitzwilliam, 1st Earl of Southampton.

== Career ==
Anthony Browne's recorded royal services began in 1518, when he was appointed surveyor and master of hunting for the Yorkshire castles and lordships of Hatfield, Thorne, and Conisbrough. He was in an embassy to hand over Tournai to King Francis I of France. Thomas Howard, Earl of Surrey, knighted him on 1 July 1522. In 1525 he was made lieutenant of the Isle of Man. He was the English ambassador to France in 1527, reporting home in increasingly anti-French terms.

Browne played a supporting role in the military suppression of the 1536 Roman Catholic uprisings in Lincolnshire and Yorkshire, commonly known as the Pilgrimage of Grace. In particular, he led a force of around 2000 mounted troops to Lincoln in October 1536 and was placed in charge of a garrison at Barton-upon-Humber the following month.

In 1539 Browne was elected as a Member of Parliament for the county seat of Surrey and was elected again in 1542, 1545, and 1547. In 1539 he was appointed as the king's Master of the Horse, a position he retained until his death as well as Standard-Bearer to Henry VIII. He was also a friend to the King.

In January 1540, when King Henry VIII went to Rochester in Kent to meet his future fourth wife, Anne of Cleves, he first sent Browne, as his Master of the Horse, into her chamber. Browne later declared that he was never more dismayed in his life, "lamenting in his heart to see the Lady so far unlike that which was reported". Henry VIII confided his own disappointment the next day to Browne as they returned to Greenwich Palace on the royal barge. There is one report, however, that Browne was proxy for Henry at a marriage in Cleves, but that hasn't been substantiated. If Browne had already seen Anne, then it's unlikely he would have made a note of her appearance at Rochester Castle.

In 1540 Browne was made a Knight of the Garter and was granted Battle Abbey, the buildings and estate of which had come into the hands of the Crown in 1538 following the Dissolution of the Monasteries, which he turned into a country house.

In 1542, on the death of his elder half-brother the Earl of Southampton, Browne inherited from him the estate of Cowdray House in Sussex, purchased by him in 1528. Browne completed the building of "that magnificent house" which was destroyed by fire in 1793, but which was rebuilt. It was sold in 1843 to the 6th Earl of Egmont by the nieces of the 8th Viscount Montagu.

Browne had to be careful not to be brought down by factional politics at the court of King Henry VIII. A possible threat to his position was his mother Lucy Neville, an unreconciled Yorkist who was never trusted by the Tudors. He became so trusted by the king that in his later years he held a dry stamp of the King's signature, to use for minor letters. By 1547 he was Keeper of Oatlands Palace. As an executor to Henry's will, Browne was also to be guardian of Prince Edward/Edward VI and the Princess Elizabeth. Following Henry's death, Browne rode to Hertford where the nine year old Prince Edward was, and brought him to Enfield where his half-sister Princess Elizabeth was living. When both children were together he told them of their father's death and that Edward was now king. Apparently both children wept inconsolably at hearing the news. Browne rode beside the new king into London.

== Marriages and issue ==
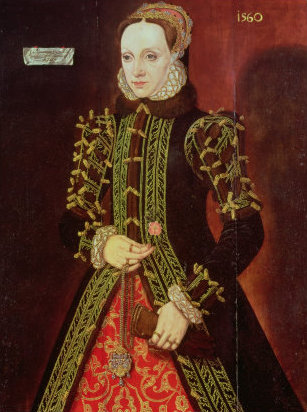
Lady Elizabeth FitzGerald, great-grand-daughter of Queen Elizabeth Woodville and second wife of Sir Anthony Browne

He married twice:

- Firstly, before 1528, to Alice Gage (died pre-1540), a daughter of Sir John Gage by his wife Philippa Guildford, by whom he had seven sons and three daughters:
  - Anthony Browne, 1st Viscount Montagu, eldest son and heir;
  - Mary Browne, who married Lord John Grey of Pirgo, her step-mother's first cousin and a younger son of Thomas Grey, 2nd Marquess of Dorset. She was the mother of Henry Grey, 1st Baron Grey of Groby;
  - Mabel Browne, who married Gerald FitzGerald, 11th Earl of Kildare, her step-mother's brother;
  - William Browne, who married Anne Hastings (24 February 1529 – 1572), the eldest of the two sisters and co-heiresses of John Hastings, de jure 15th Baron Hastings (27 July 1531 – 8 January 1541/2), of Elsing in Norfolk. Anne's parents were Hugh Hastings, de jure 14th Baron Hastings (d. 9 December 1540) and Katherine le Strange (d. 2 February 1558), the sister of Sir Thomas le Strange. The eventual heiress of Elsing and Wesenham was Phillipa Browne, who married John Berney (d.1719), and thus Elsing passed to her Berney descendants. The eventual heiress Frances Berney (born 1760) married the Reverend Richard Eaton, Rector of Elsing, who assumed by royal licence dated 1786 the surname "Browne", thus Elsing Hall was once again held by the Browne family.
  - Lucy Browne, who married Thomas Roper (1533–1598), of Eltham in Kent, MP.
  - Henry Browne
  - Francis Browne
  - Thomas Browne
  - George Browne
  - Henry Browne (again)
- Secondly, at sometime after 1540, he married Lady Elizabeth Fitzgerald, a daughter of Gerald FitzGerald, 9th Earl of Kildare by his wife Lady Elizabeth Grey, a daughter of Thomas Grey, 1st Marquess of Dorset, a son of Elizabeth Woodville, later the wife of King Edward IV. She was one of the great beauties of her age, known as the "Fair Geraldine". She survived her husband and re-married to Edward Clinton, 1st Earl of Lincoln. By his second wife he had two further children who both died young:
  - Edward Browne
  - Thomas Browne

== Death and burial ==
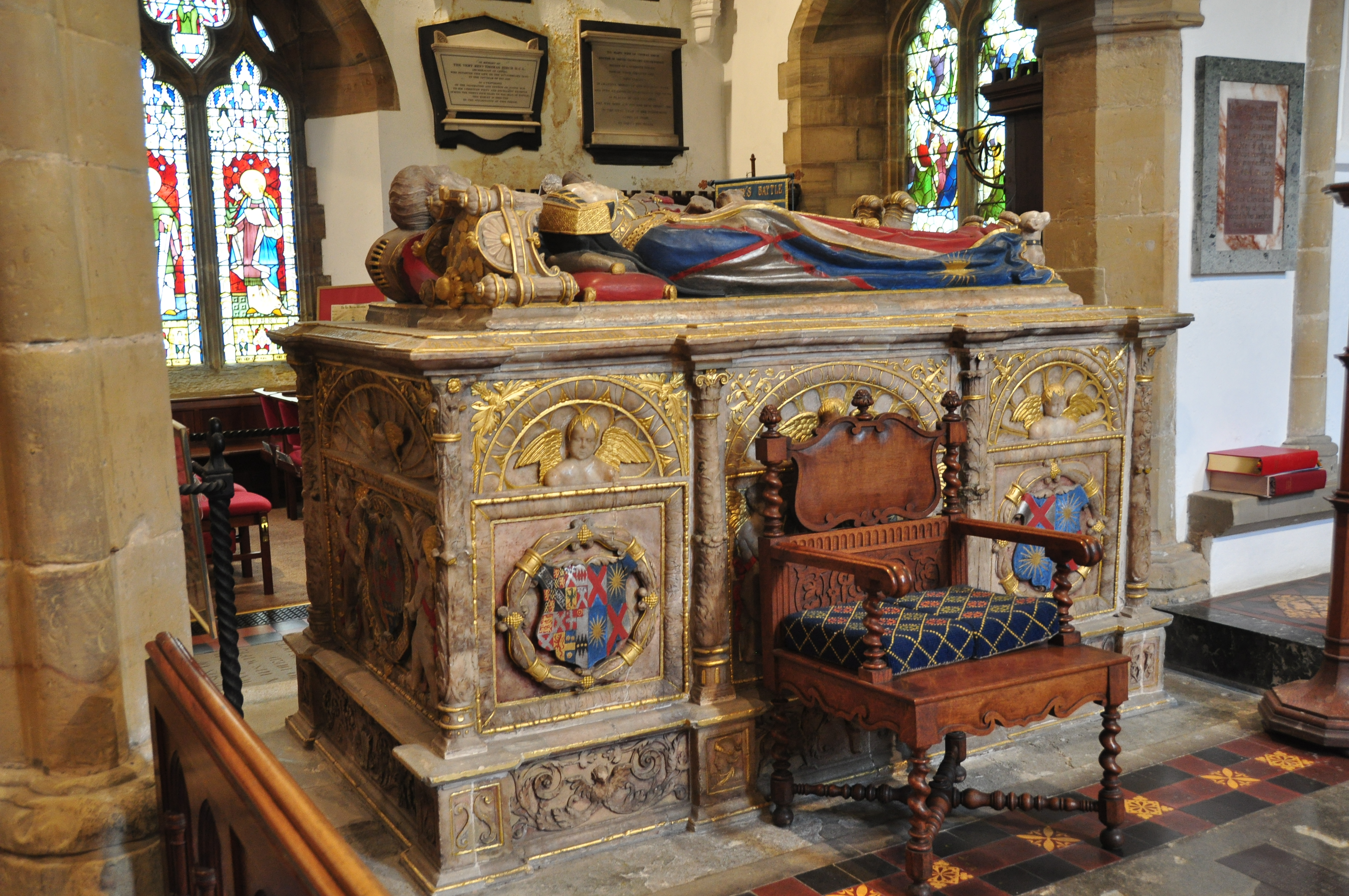
Chest tomb monument with effigies of Sir Anthony Browne and his first wife Alice Gage, in St Mary the Virgin Church, Battle

Anthony Browne died on 6 May 1548 at Byfleet House in Surrey, which he built, and was buried in St Mary the Virgin Church, Battle, Sussex, in the tomb of his first wife Alice Gage, as requested in his will. His chest tomb with effigies of himself and his first wife Alice Gage survives. He was succeeded in his estates by his eldest son, Anthony Browne, who subsequently in 1554 was created Viscount Montagu.

== King's mistresses ==
Two members of the Browne family were reported to have been among the mistresses of Henry VIII. One of these, recorded only as a 'Mistress Browne', was allegedly his sister. This lady was stated to have been a prime mover in the downfall of Anne Boleyn, the king's second wife. Elizabeth Somerset, Countess of Worcester was a lady-in-waiting to Queen Anne Boleyn and the chief witness against her at her trial for adultery. Another less closely related member of Browne's family, Anne Basset, was rumoured to be in the running to become Henry VIII's fifth wife, and there were rumours of an earlier affair, shortly before the king's marriage to Anne of Cleves in January 1540.

== Cowdray engravings ==
16th-century wall-paintings, originally commissioned by Sir Anthony Browne and were painted onto the walls of Browne's hall in Cowdray House. The original paintings were destroyed by fire in 1793, but their appearances survive in etchings made while they existed.

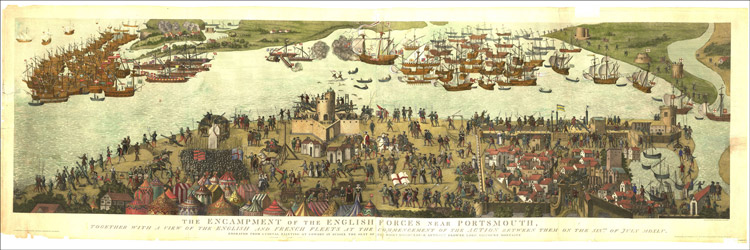
The encampment of the English forces near Portsmouth, together with a view of the English and French fleets at the commencement of the action between them on the 19th of July 1544

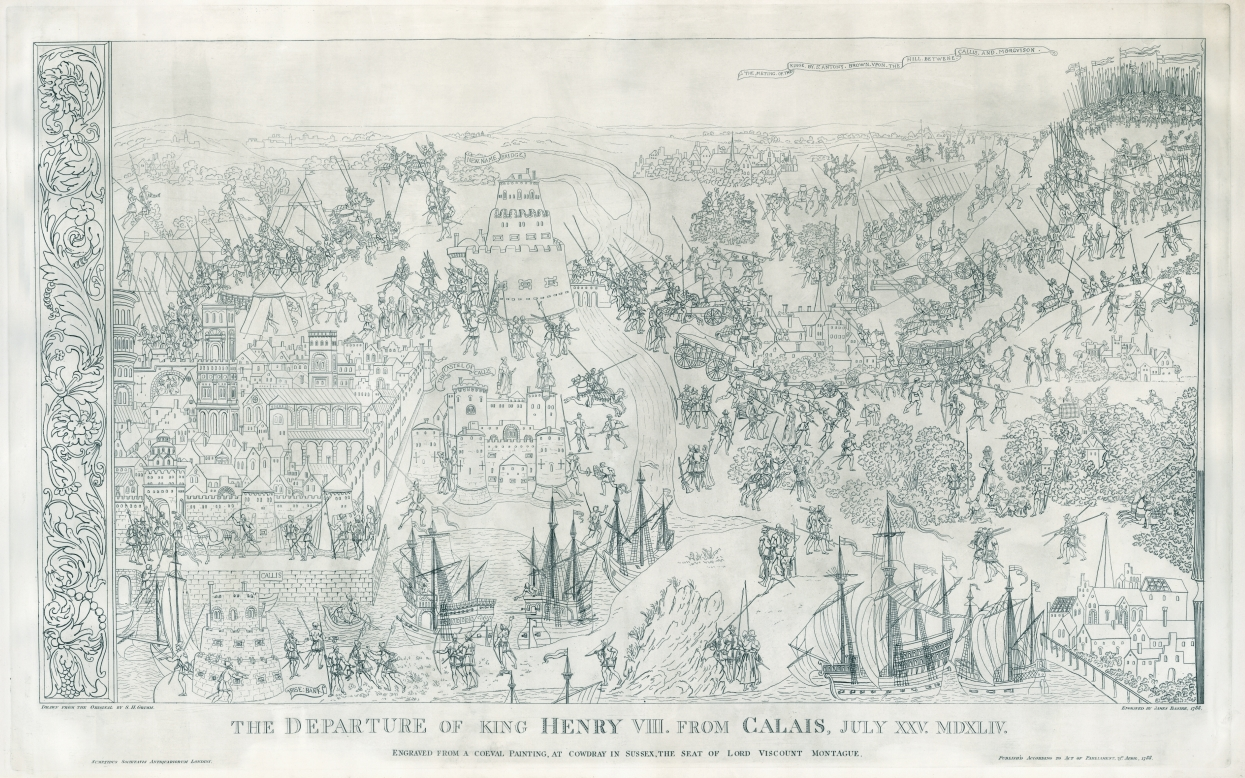
The Departure of King Henry VIII from Calais, on 25 July 1544, Subtitled 'The Meting of the Kinge by S'r Antony Brown Upon the Hill Betweene Callis and Morguison

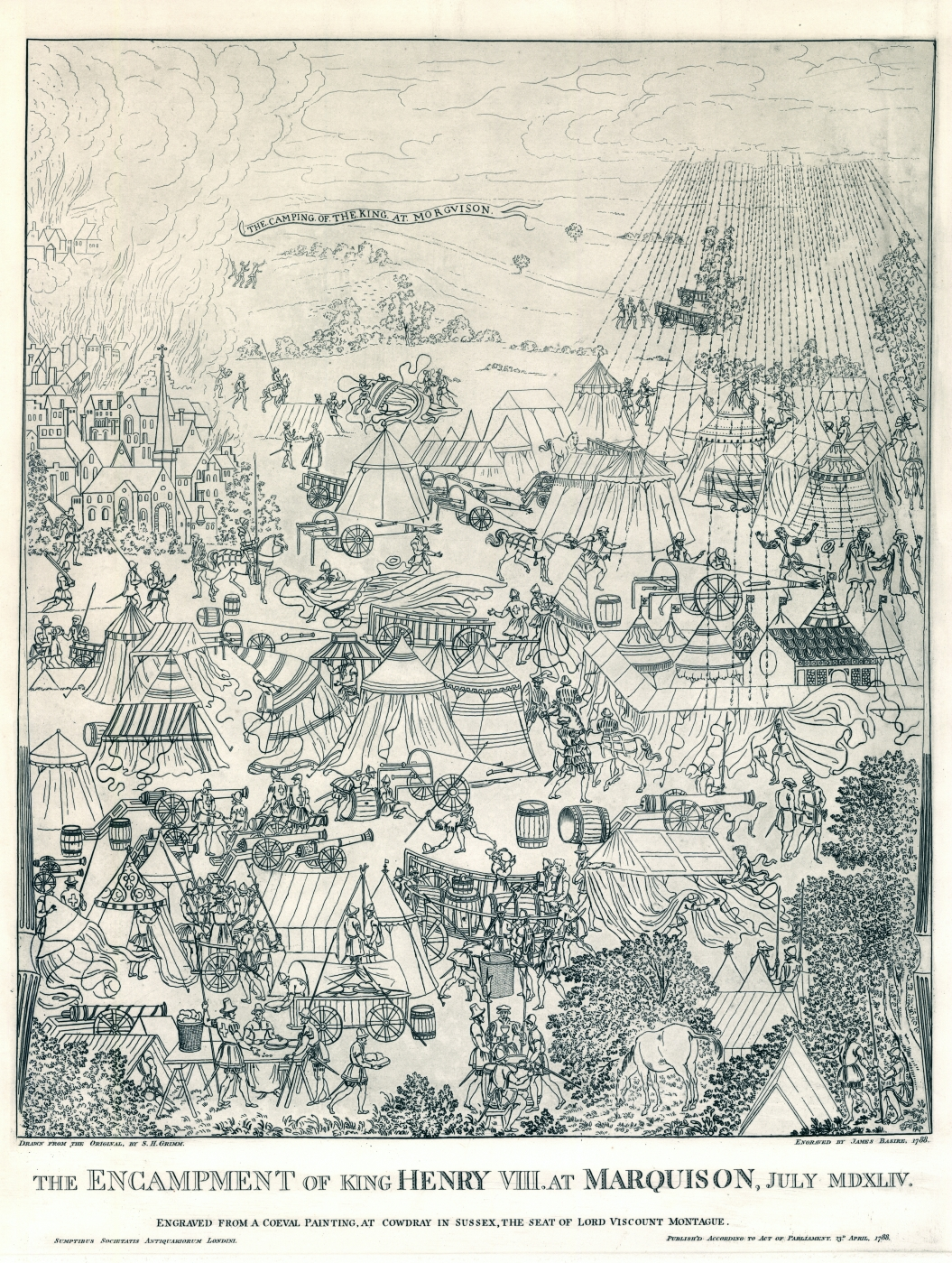
The Encampment of King Henry VIII at Marquison (Marquise), in July 1544

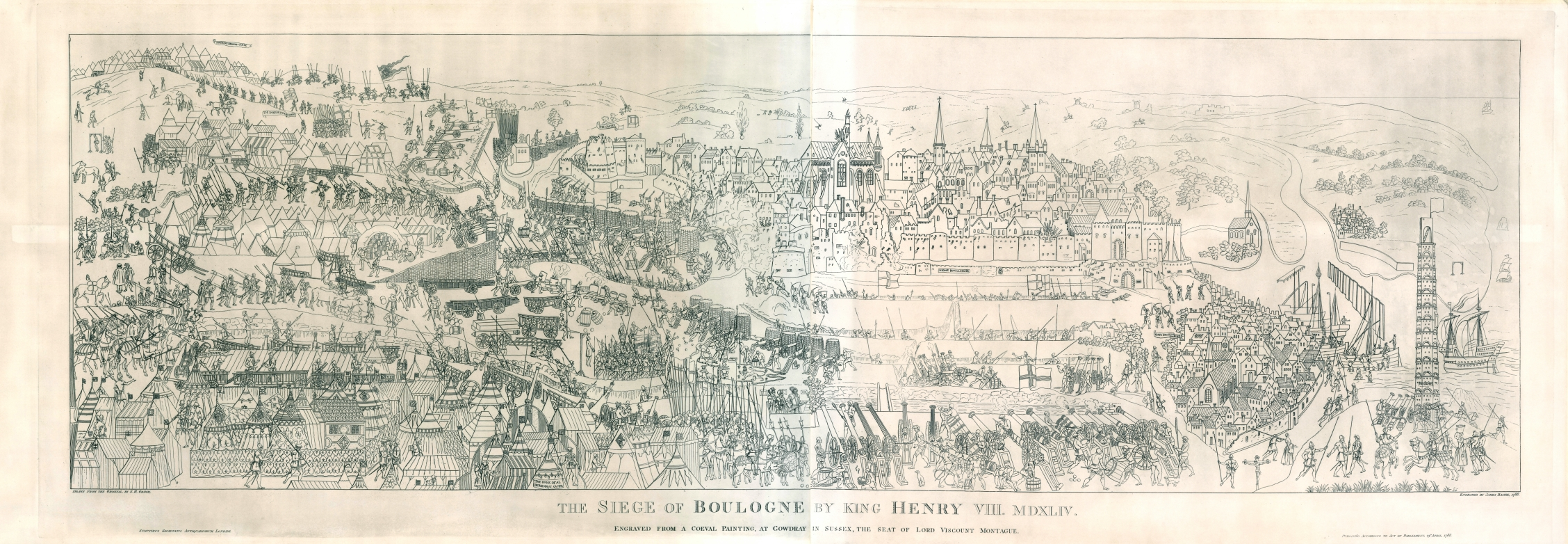
The Siege of Boulogne by King Henry VIII in 1544

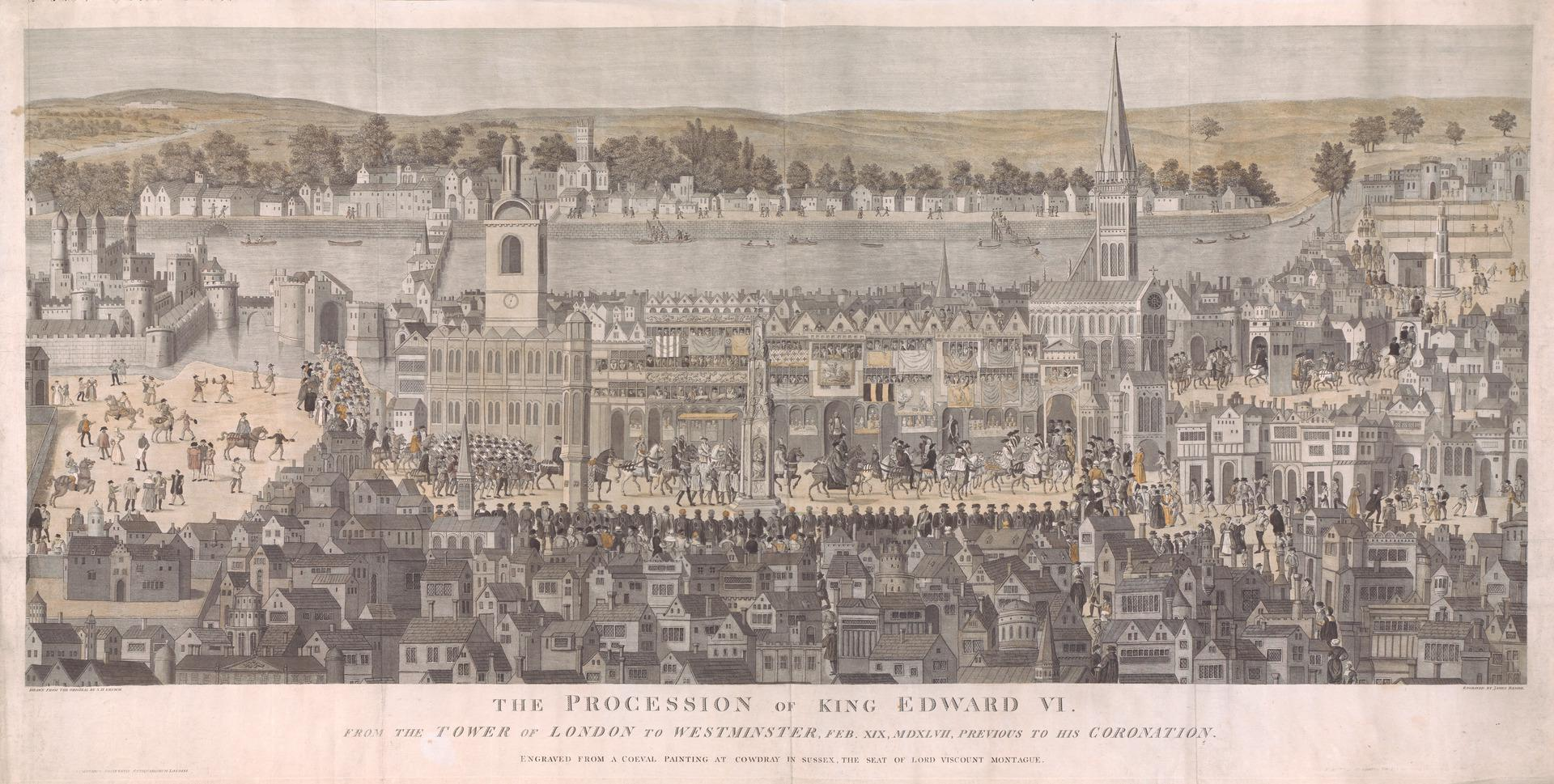
The Procession of King Edward VI from the Tower

Political offices
Preceded by Sir Nicholas Carew	Master of the Horse; 1539–1548	Succeeded by Sir William Herbert
Honorary titles
Preceded by The Earl of Essex	Captain of the Gentlemen Pensioners; 1539–1548	Succeeded by Lord Braye
Preceded by new title	Lieutenant and Keeper of Hampton Court Chase, Ranger of Bushy Park; 1539–1548	Succeeded by Sir Michael Stanhope
Legal offices
Preceded by The Earl of Rutland	Justice in Eyre (Justice of royal forests) north of the Trent; 1546–1548	Succeeded by The Earl of Shrewsbury
