= Listed buildings in Etwall =

Etwall is a civil parish in the South Derbyshire district of Derbyshire, England. The parish contains 16 listed buildings that are recorded in the National Heritage List for England. Of these, one is listed at Grade I, the highest of the three grades, two are at Grade II*, the middle grade, and the others are at Grade II, the lowest grade. The parish contains the village of Etwall and the surrounding area, and all the listed buildings are in the village. Most of them are houses and associated structures, and the others include a church, a group of almshouses and its gateway, a public house, and a well head.

== Key ==
Grade	Criteria
I	Buildings of exceptional interest, sometimes considered to be internationally important
II*	Particularly important buildings of more than special interest
II	Buildings of national importance and special interest

== Buildings ==
Name and location	Photograph	Date	Notes	Grade
St Helen's Church; 52.88472°N 1.60182°W		Late 12th century	The church has been altered and extended through the centuries, and was restored in 1881. It is built in sandstone with slate roofs, and consists of a nave, a north aisle and chapel, a south porch, a chancel and a north vestry, and a west tower. The tower has two stages, diagonal buttresses, a three-light west window with a four-centred arched head, bell openings with Y-tracery and hood moulds, a clock face on the east front, a moulded string course with central gargoyles, and embattled parapets with ridgeback coping. The south doorway has a round head, and dates from the 13th century.	I
Etwall Lawns; 52.88587°N 1.59875°W	—	17th century	A timber framed house later encased in brick and rendered, and with a tile roof. There are two storeys and an irregular plan, consisting of a small recessed central gabled bay, flanked by advanced wide gabled bays, a short wing set back to the west, and a later single-storey addition to the east. On the front are two single-storey bow windows with balconies, and in the upper floor of the three gables is a sash window with a four-centred arched head and Gothic tracery. The middle bay of the west wing projects and contains a pair of four-centred arched doorways, over which is a parapet on a corbel tale. Above this is a niche flanked by casement windows.	II
Garden walls 52.88523°N 1.60395°W	—	17th century (probable)	The gardens walls to Etwall Hall, now demolished, consist of two walls 8 feet (2.4 m) high at right angles. They are in red brick on a sandstone plinth with stone quoins at the corner, and are capped with concrete coping blocks.	II
The Old Red House; 52.88596°N 1.59864°W	—	17th century	The house has a timber framed core, and was encased in red brick in the early 18th century. It has stone dressings, a stone plinth, a moulded eaves cornice, a coped parapet, and a tile roof with coped gables. There are three storeys and five bays. In the centre is a doorway with a gauged flat brick arch and a keystone, and there is a similar, smaller doorway to the south. The windows are sashes with flat arches and keystones.	II
48 and 50 Main Street; 52.88471°N 1.60038°W	—	Late 17th century	Three, later two, timber framed cottages on a rendered plinth with rendered infill and a tile roof. There are two storeys, No. 48 has four bays, and No. 50 has two. In the front is a gabled porch, and the windows are casements, and some have mullions.	II
80 Main Street; 52.88571°N 1.59908°W	—	Late 17th century	A timber framed house with brick and plaster infill, partly rebuilt in red brick, with a tile roof and a coped west gable. There are two storeys and four bays. The windows are casements, and most of the openings have segmental heads.	II
Sir John Port Almshouses; 52.88540°N 1.60196°W		1681	The almshouses are in red brick with stone dressings on coped plinths, with a string course, and tile roofs with ridgeback copings and moulded kneelers. There are 16 cottages, twelve around a courtyard and four added later. Each cottage has a single storey and a gabled attic, and a single bay, and it contains a doorway with a four-centred arch and two-light mullioned windows. In the centre of the north range is a semicircular archway with a moulded surround, imposts, and a keystone. Above it is a moulded string course and an inscribed marble plaque, and three coats of arms in cartouches with masks above. Over this is a plain frieze and a swan-neck scrolled open pediment with a central achievement.	II*
58 Main Street; 52.88496°N 1.59990°W	—	Early 18th century	A house that was extended in the early 19th century, in painted and rendered brick, with floor bands, and a tile roof. There are two storeys and attics, a front of three bays, and a two-storey two-bay rear extension. In the centre is a trellis-work porch, and the windows are sashes.	II
Gates, gatepiers, and railings, Etwall Almshouses; 52.88517°N 1.60194°W		Early 18th century	The gates are by Robert Bakewell, made for Etwall Hall, and later moved to their present site. They are in wrought iron, and consist of a pair of gates in a frame with scrolled panels, over which is an elaborate overthrow with a shield and a crest and flanking scrollwork. To the sides are low brick walls with chamfered stone copings and railings with urn finials. At the ends are pairs of square brick piers with moulded stone cornices.	II*
Blenheim Farmhouse; 52.88496°N 1.60008°W		18th century	A farmhouse, later a private house, that was much extended in about 1840. It is in red brick with stone dressings, a moulded cornice, and a hipped slate roof. There are two storeys and three bays. The central doorway has pilasters, a divided fanlight, and an ornate cornice. The windows are sashes with wedge lintels and incised voussoirs. The remains of the farmhouse at the rear have segmental-headed casement windows and a tile roof.	II
The Vicarage; 52.88519°N 1.60066°W	—	Mid 18th century	The vicarage, which was later altered and extended, is in red brick with stone dressings, a floor band, a bracketed eaves cornice, and tile roofs with coped gables. There are two storeys and two bays, a later two-storey bay to the left, a single-storey bay to the right, and a large three-bay rear extension. In the original part are sash windows with wedge lintels, incised voussoirs, and double keystones. In the right extension is a doorway with a moulded surround and a casement window.	II
78 Main Street and outbuilding 52.88545°N 1.59943°W	—	Late 18th century	The house and outbuilding are in red brick, with a dentilled eaves band, and tile roofs with chamfered coped gables and moulded kneelers. The house has three storeys and two bays, a central doorway with a bracketed hood, and sash windows. The outbuilding recessed to the left has two storeys and one bay, and contains a rusticated basket-headed arch and a 20th-century window above.	II
Etwall Lodge; 52.88233°N 1.59645°W	—	1812	The house is in red brick with stone dressings, an eaves band and a hipped slate roof. There are two storeys and three bays, the middle bay projecting under a ramped parapet. The central doorway has pilasters and a traceried fanlight, and the windows are mullioned sashes. In the parapet is a plaque with an achievement.	II
Hawk and Buckle Inn and stable block 52.88475°N 1.60077°W		Early 19th century	The public house and stable block are in red brick with stone dressings, a dentilled eaves band, hipped tile roofs, and two storeys. The public house has five bays, a central doorway with a moulded surround, a frieze and a dentilled cornice, and the windows are sashes with wedge lintels. The stable block to the right has three bays, it contains a wide segmental-headed archway and the windows are blocked under wedge lintels.	II
The Limes and coach house 52.88607°N 1.59860°W	—	Early 19th century	A red brick house with stone dressings, a floor band, a moulded eaves cornice, a low parapet, and a hipped tile roof. There are two storeys and three bays, and a lower coach house on the left. In the centre is a Roman Doric porch with fluted capitals, a frieze with roundels, and a door with a traceried fanlight. The windows are sashes with wedge lintels and keystones. The coach house has a blind two-storey segmental-headed niche with double doors, and a moulded arch above.	II
Well head 52.88446°N 1.60231°W	—	Early 19th century	The well head is in sandstone, and is a low rectangular building with a hipped roof. There is a small opening to the west with a wooden frame, and on the south side is a square pool.	II
