= List of lieutenants of Hampton Court Chase, Rangers of Bushy Park =

This is a list of lieutenants and keepers of Hampton Court Chase and ex officio rangers of Bushy Park.

== History ==
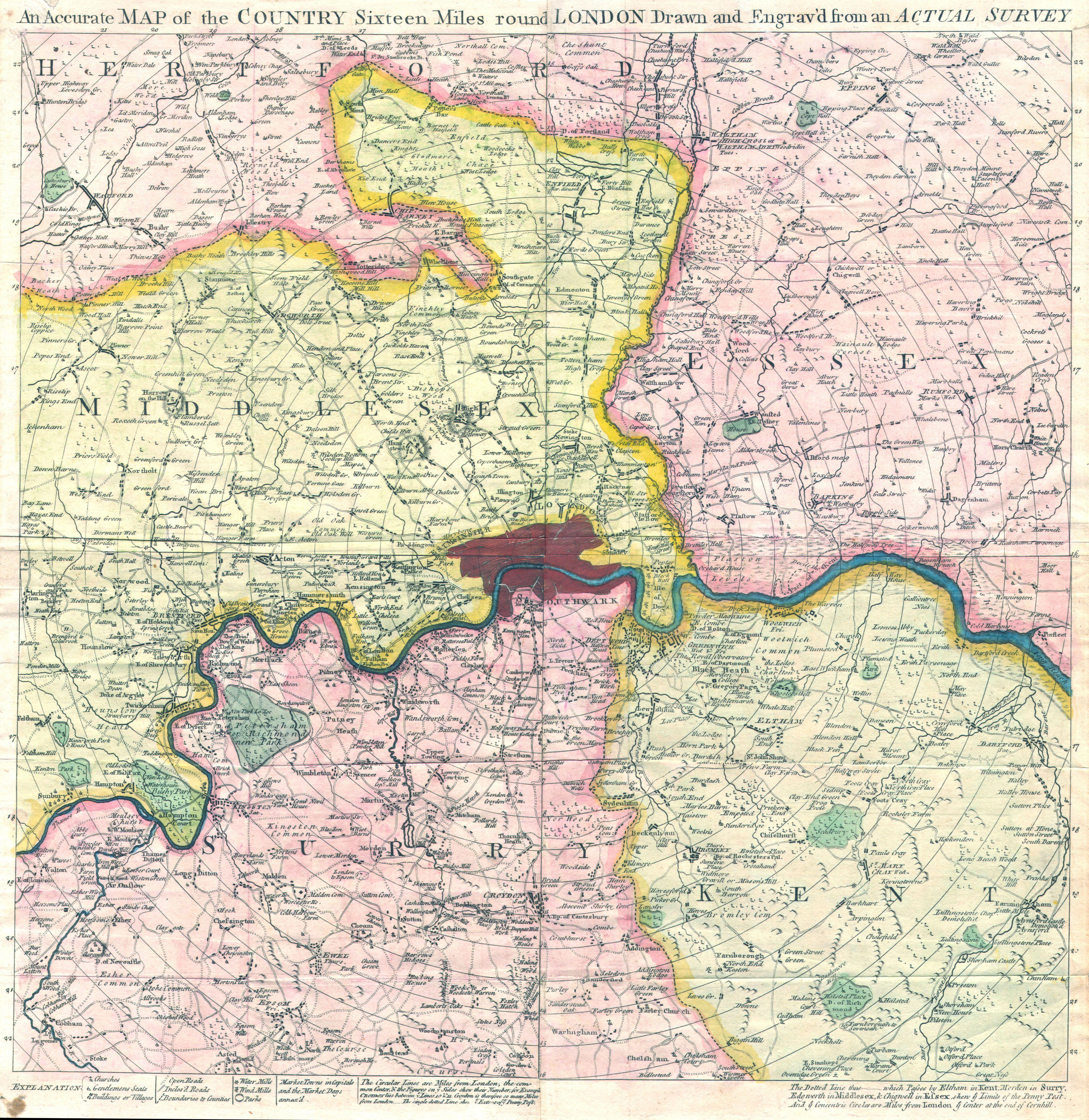
Extract from Gentleman's Magazine: Map of London & Environs, 1764 noting the Earl of Halifax owned more than one Gentleman's Houses [mansions] in and adjoining Bushy Park, Hampton and Teddington, Middlesex

In 1539 Hampton Court Chase was created an 'honour' by an act of parliament instigated by Henry VIII and passed as a public act by approval of Parliament and the King. The title holder increasingly over time referred to as ranger or keeper of Bushey Park held as his domain the right to build and rebuild a grand house in Bushy Park coupled with a degree of local power and exercise likewise to the monarch in hunting rights. Henry thereby created the first forest since the New Forest of William the Conqueror and obtained the rights to a share of cattle and game in the extent to append to his "close park" to Hampton Court Palace taken from Wolsey. The area's other local landowners included principally manorial tenants of the confiscated Chertsey and Westminster Abbeys – and made all non-mete parts an overall chase for royal and official hunting parties for boar, game birds, hare, coneys and deer. (Note: In the era in which the Chase was founded many private land interests 'escheated to' (owners failed to pay a relief to effect livery of seisin after inquisitions post mortem); 'were surrendered to' (were purchased by); or were forfeited by attainder/were among attainted estates (see attainder) to the Crown (monarch).) Holding all persons to account for animal grazing and wood-taking financially were added benefits. The statute set up a new forest or chase for the king, to be called 'Hampton Court Chase' but which was smaller than the many square miles the King wished:

But it plainly appeareth both by the kings...indenture [...of first October 1537...(legal deed)], and by the judgement of the whole parliament that the king could neither erect any chase or forest over any mans grounds without their consent and agreement.

— Sir Edward Coke, Fourth Part: Institutes of the Lawes of England published 1644,

The bounds of the chase apart from Bushy Park took in the manors of Hampton, Hanworth, Kempton, Walton-on-Thames. Parliament, through the courts, was deemed to have strongly curtailed its royal forest rights so as not to impinge on freeholds nor main customary tenants lands in Molesey, Weybridge, Cobham and part of Esher, its furthest reach due to Henry's legal deed (indenture) of 1537.

The ranger or keeper in early years held the position of housekeeper of the Palace. The rangership of the land in the bend of the river east of the palace, the 'house' or 'home' Park was usually separate. Kit Villiers, an ennobled courtier by James I, inherited the honour from his brother and took as his official seat Ashley House (and Ashley Park) in Walton on Thames. Reinstatement in wealth and titles to the Villiers (Earls of Jersey and Anglesey) family after the English Civil War failed to reunite the more southerly lands associated with the honour which were taken and sold in the course of the 1649-1660 Commonwealth of England. Some holders of the title lived in Bushy Park seasonally or as their main home. The monarch tended to grant the title to the main heir of the previous holder. Parliament in the English Interregnum granted the title to General Monck, who remained in favour in the English Restoration.

== Office Holders ==
| Name | Period held | How ended | Notes |
|---|---|---|---|
| Sir Anthony Browne | 1539-1548 | natural death | |
| Sir Michael Stanhope | 1548-1552 | beheaded | implicated by the government of Mary I in the affairs of her brother King Edward's regent, "the Protector Somerset" so beheaded (and estates attainted) in 1552. |
| William Parr, 1st Marquis of Northampton | c.1559 (assumed)-1571 | | |
| Charles, "Lord Howard of Effingham", afterwards 1st Earl of Nottingham | c.1571 (assumed)-1624 | | |
| James Hamilton, 2nd Marquis of Hamilton | c.1624 (assumed)-1625 | | |
| George Villiers, 1st Duke of Buckingham | dates | | the favourite of both James I and Charles I |
| Christopher Villiers, 1st Earl of Anglesey | dates | | Main residence: Ashley Park, brother of the above |
During the Commonwealth the office appears to have been in abeyance, revived on Oliver Cromwell's death.
| General George Monck | 1658-1677 | death | created Duke of Albemarle, celebrated Parliamentarian and military leader; appointment confirmed by Charles II on his restoration. |
| Barbara Villiers, Duchess of Cleveland via her trustee, William Young | c.1677-1709 | natural death | Long-term mistress of Charles II. Barbara's mother married Charles Villiers, 2nd Earl of Anglesey the year after the death of Barbara's father (1643), his cousin. The Earl, son of the penultimate holder, died childless in 1661 from smallpox; her mother died in 1672 without a Will. The duchess administered the estate and was confirmed in the title. |
| Charles Montagu, 1st Earl of Halifax | 1709-1714 | natural death | |
| George Montagu, 1st Earl of Halifax | 1714-1739 | natural death | nephew of the above |
| George Montagu-Dunk, 2nd Earl of Halifax | 1739-1771 | natural death | |
| Anne, Lady North, afterwards Countess of Guildford | 1771-1797 | natural death | husband was nephew of the above and Prime Minister |
| Prince William, Duke of Clarence | 1797 | natural death | Devolved to Queen Adelaide on his death on whose death title deemed extinct. The closely related asset (perquisite) Bushy House was let to Prince Louis, Duke of Nemours of France, 1865-1897 and granted to a national scientific body in about the year 1903. |

== See also ==
- Bushy Park
- Bushy House/The New Lodge (National Physical Laboratory)
- Ashley Park House (demolished)
- Acts of 1539 (Henry VIII anno 31, chapter 5) of the Parliament of England
- Royal chase
- Royal forest
