= Shelford Priory =

Priory in Nottinghamshire, England

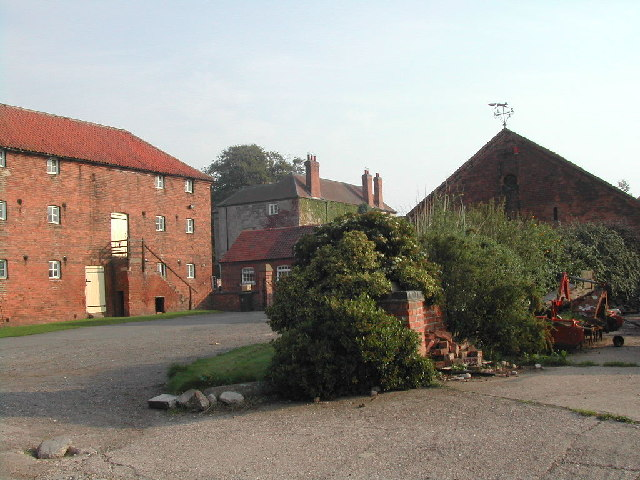
- Shelford Manor

- Location within Nottinghamshire
- Interactive map of Shelford Priory

Monastery information
- Order: Augustinian
- Disestablished: 1536
- Dedication: Virgin Mary

People
- Founder: Roger FitzRalph

Site
- Location: Shelford, Nottinghamshire
- Coordinates: 52.9841°N 1.0000°W
- Visible remains: Yes: Shelford Manor, constructed on the site.

Shelford Priory is a former Augustinian Monastery located in the village of Shelford, Nottinghamshire, United Kingdom. The priory was founded by Ralph Haunselyn around 1160–80 and dissolved in 1536. Little remains of the original priory. Following dissolution it was granted to Michael Stanhope, and c.1600 Shelford Manor was constructed on the site. The manor was fortified and then partially destroyed during the English Civil War. The house was reconstructed c.1678, however, it was altered in the 18th and 19th centuries. It is now known as Shelford Manor and is a private residence.

== The Priory ==
Shelford priory was a small monastery founded on the south-bank of the River Trent by Ralph Haunselyn (or Hauselin) during the reign of King Henry II (1154-1189), and dedicated to the Virgin Mary.

In 1258, the question of who founded the priory was argued. William Bardolf and Adam de Everingham took each other to court to decide who was the hereditary patron of the priory. Bardolf claimed the priory was founded by his ancestor, Ralph Haunselyn; whereas de Everingham claimed it was founded by his ancestor, Robert de Caus. The prior was unable to settle the dispute as both Bardolf and de Everingham "held a Moiety of the barony of Shelford", and the prior had one charter stating Haunselyn had founded the priory, a second in which de Caus refers to "his monks of Shelford", and a third which was a joint grant by both Haunselyn and de Caus. The jury in the case found in favour of Bardolf, declaring the founder was Ralph Haunselyn.

The 1291 Taxation Roll records the priory as having an income of £37 18s. 3d.

The priory was visited by King Edward II in 1317 and 1319.

The 1534 Valor Ecclesiasticus records the priory as having an income of £151 14s. 1d. (£116 12s. 1¼d. after expenses). The priory controlled the churches of Gedling, Burton Joyce, North Muskham, Saxondale and Shelford in Nottinghamshire; Elvaston church and Ockbrook chapel, in Derbyshire; Rauceby and Westborough church and half of Dorrington church in Lincolnshire. The priory also owned land in Nottinghamshire, Derbyshire and Lincolnshire. Outgoings included £10 a year for "the chantry of Corpus Christi in the church of Newark", and £2 6s. 8d. given in alms in commemoration for the founders Ralph Haunselyn and Robert de Caus.

Shortly before the Dissolution of the Monasteries there were twelve canons in residence.

The priory was dissolved in 1536 and Robert Dyxson, the last prior, was granted a pension of £16 a year.

=== Relics ===
During the 1536 inspection of the priory by Richard Layton and Thomas Legh, it was noted that the priory housed the milk and "the girdle of the Virgin Mary and part of a candle which she was said to have carried at her Purification", and oil from both the True Cross and Saint Katherine.

=== Priors of Shelford ===
- Alexander, occurs 1204
- William, occurs c. 1225
- John de Nottingham, occurs 1271, resigned 1289
- Robert de Tithby, 1289
- Laurence, died c. 1310
- Thomas de Lexinton, c. 1310
- Robert de Mannesfield, 1315
- William de Breton, 1320
- William de Leicester, 1340
- Stephen de Bassyngborn, 1349
- Thomas de Chilwell, 1349
- (Alexander de Insula, elected 1358)
- Roger de Graystock, appointed 1358
- William de Kynalton, 1365
- Robert Lyndby, 1404
- William de Righton, 1408
- Walter Cutwolfe, died 1459
- John Bottesford, 1459
- Richard Stokes, 1479
- Robert Helmsley, 1491
- Henry Sharp, 1498
- Robert Dickson

== Shelford Manor ==
=== The first manor ===
On 25 March 1536 Archbishop Cranmer wrote to Thomas Cromwell asking for "the farm of the priory of Shelford" for his brother-in-law:—'I desire your favor for the bearer, my brother-in-law, who is now clerk of my kitchen, to have the farm of the priory of Shelford, or of some other house in Notts, now suppressed.' However, in 1536 or 1537, the crown granted "nearly all the manors and advowsons" to Sir Michael Stanhope (second son of Sir Edward Stanhope (d.1511) of Rampton, Nottinghamshire), for 60 years at a rental of £20. In November 1537 Stanhope, and his wife Anne, were granted the priory site, including the priory church, belfry and churchyard, and "a good deal of land".

Michael Stanhope was executed in 1552 and the estate passed from father to son:

- Sir Thomas Stanhope (1540–1596)
- Sir John Stanhope (1559–1611)
- Philip Stanhope, 1st Earl of Chesterfield (1584 – 1656).

Shelford Manor was built on the former priory site c.1600. The architect was "probably" Robert Smythson or John Smythson.

==== Siege and destruction ====
Philip Stanhope, 1st Earl of Chesterfield was summoned to Parliament in 1640 and took the side of King Charles I in the threatening conflict. When the English Civil War broke out he and his sons took up arms. From around January 1643, Shelford Manor was garrisoned under the command of his son Philip Stanhope. The manor was fortified during the war, and "traces of civil war fieldworks" still survive. The manor was described as "a fortified house surrounded by a very strong 'bulwark' and a great ditch on the outside of it partly filled with water", with mentions of a drawbridge and defensive "'half moons' within the bulwark".

The house was surrounded on 1 November 1645 by forces led by Colonel John Hutchinson and Colonel-General Sydnam Poyntz. The summons to surrender was rejected by Philip Stanhope.

Lucy Hutchinson, the wife of Colonel Hutchinson, described some of the tactics of the defenders:

When he came thither, a few of the Shelford soldiers were gotten into the steeple of the church, and from thence so played upon the garrison’s men that they could not quietly take up their quarters. There was a trapdoor that went into the belfry, and they had made it fast, and drew up the ladders and the bell-ropes, and regarded not the Governor’s threatening to have no quarter if they came not down, so that he was forced to send for straw and fire it and smother them out.

The house was stormed on 3 November. The attack started at 4 o'clock and lasted just half an hour. Stanhope was killed and many defenders (160 Royalists) were massacred, and 140 were taken prisoner. Shelford House was plundered for valuables and burnt to the ground. On the following day, Colonel-General Poyntz moved to Wiverton Hall in Nottinghamshire which suffered the same fate.

Historian David Appleby has said that a "frenzied massacre", which may have included women and children, followed the battle, and the whole encounter was later covered up, not mentioned by either side. Appleby suggests that the Parliamentarians wanted to forget the savagery, and the defending Royalists to hide the presence of "European Catholics" of the Queen's Regiment, who had a very bad reputation.

=== Reconstruction ===
The house was rebuilt after the civil war (c.1678) by another son of Philip Stanhope, 1st Earl of Chesterfield, Arthur Stanhope (1627–1677). This building still exists, although it has now been vacated by the Stanhopes. A 2019 aerial study by the University of Nottingham shows the layout of the original Priory and mentions that the current farmhouse was almost certainly the monastic ‘prior’s lodgings’ and retains a considerable amount of the original medieval building. The site is now a private residence.

== See also ==
- Grade II* listed buildings in Nottinghamshire
- Listed buildings in Shelford, Nottinghamshire
