= John Hotham (died c.1609) =

English politician

John Hotham (died c. 1609) was the Member of Parliament for Scarborough in 1584 and Hedon in 1586.

He was a son of Francis Hotham and Mary, a daughter of Humphrey Hercy or Horsey of Grove, Nottinghamshire. His family lands were at Scorborough in Yorkshire. The house at Scorborough burnt down in 1705.

A surviving portrait of John Hotham was formerly attributed to the artist Abraham Janssens.

== Marriages and children ==
Hotham was orphaned at the age of 7, and became a ward. According the legal custom of the day, his wardship was purchased by Anne Stanhope, the widow of Michael Stanhope, and after a period in the household of William Cecil, he was married to her daughter Juliana. Subsequently, in 1569 Anne Stanhope wrote several letters to William Cecil complaining of his failings as a husband to her daughter. It seems that Juliana had returned to her family home and Hotham slandered her reputation. When Cecil summoned him to London, Hotham sent his excuses. They had four daughters including Elizabeth, Jane, and Juliana.

His second wife was Mary, a daughter of George Goring of Burton, Sussex. They had a son.

His third wife was Jane, a daughter of Richard Legard of Rysome in Holderness. They had a son and three daughters.

Sir John Hotham was his son with Jane Legard, and was a cousin of Sir Hugh Chomeley. Hugh Chomely's mother, Susanna Legard, was orphaned and lived at Scorborough as a child. The younger John Hotham was an investor in the English East India Company, who opposed Charles I at Hull but was executed by the Parliamentarians at the Tower of London in 1645.
