= Listed buildings in Shelford, Nottinghamshire =

Shelford is a civil parish in the Rushcliffe district of Nottinghamshire, England. The parish contains seven listed buildings that are recorded in the National Heritage List for England. Of these, two are listed at Grade II*, the middle of the three grades, and the others are at Grade II, the lowest grade. The parish contains the village of Shelford and the surrounding countryside, and the listed buildings consist of a church, a former manor house and associated structures, a farmhouse, a barn and a war memorial.

== Key ==
Grade	Criteria
II*	Particularly important buildings of more than special interest
II	Buildings of national importance and special interest

== Buildings ==
Name and location	Photograph	Date	Notes	Grade
St Peter and St Paul's Church; 52.97458°N 1.01595°W		14th century	The church has been altered and extended through the centuries, including a restoration in 1876–78 by Ewan Christian. It is built in stone, the chancel has a tile roof, and the rest of the roofs are in lead. The church consists of a nave with a clerestory, north and south aisles, a south porch, a chancel and west tower. The tower has three stages, angle buttresses, a moulded plinth, a west arched doorway with a moulded surround, above which is a three-light arched window with a hood mould, stair lights, clock faces, three-light bell openings with hood moulds, and an embattled parapet with some blind tracery.	II*
Shelford Manor House, wall and pier 52.98408°N 0.99996°W	—	c. 1600	The house is built on the site of Shelford Priory, incorporating material from it. It is built in stone with some red brick and render, on a moulded plinth, with buttresses and a hipped tile roof. There are three storeys and a basement, and an entrance front of three bays. In the centre is an open gabled porch, and a doorway with a fanlight. Above the doorway is an oeil-de-boeuf, and the other windows in the lower two floors are sashes, in the ground floor with wedge lintels, and in the middle floor with moulded surrounds. In the top floor are mullioned casements. The north front has five bays and contains a blocked doorway with imposts, panelled spandrels and a keystone. Projecting from the right is a brick wall on a plinth, containing a segmental-arched doorway ending in a stone vermiculated rusticated pier with stone coping.	II*
Gateway and wall, Shelford Manor House; 52.98432°N 0.99994°W	—	Late 17th century	The gateway and wall incorporate medieval fragments. Flanking the gateway are chamfered rusticated stone piers with stone coping, one with an orb finial. The stone walls sweep round for about 4 metres (13 ft) and end in single small piers with the remains of pineapple finials.	II
Beech Farmhouse; 52.97412°N 1.01577°W		Early 19th century	The farmhouse is in red brick on a plinth, with dogtooth eaves and a slate roof. There are two storeys, a front of three bays, and a lower two-storey rear wing. The central doorway has a semicircular fanlight, and the windows are sashes, those in the ground floor with segmental heads.	II
Barn, Water Lane Farm; 52.97521°N 1.01235°W		Early 19th century	The barn, which was extended in 1832, is in red brick, with some blue brick, dentilled eaves and a hipped pantile roof. It contains a large doorway, and on the right is a narrow lean-to with the date of the extension in blue brick.	II
Granary, Shelford Manor; 52.98375°N 1.00031°W		Mid 19th century	The granary is in red brick, with a moulded eaves band and a hipped pantile roof. There are three storeys and four bays. External steps lead up to a doorway in the middle floor. There is a doorway in the ground floor, the windows are small horizontally-sliding sashes, and all the openings have segmental heads.	II
Shelford War Memorial; 52.97242°N 1.01535°W		1920	The war memorial is in an enclosure by a road junction, and consists of a stone wheel-head cross about 4 metres (13 ft) high. It has a tapering shaft on a tapering plinth, on a base of three square steps. On the plinth are inscriptions and the names of those lost in the two World Wars.	II
