= John Port (judge) =

Sir John Port
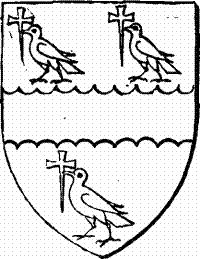
- The Port coat of arms
- Born: c.1472 Chester
- Died: March 1540; Bewdley
- Education: Middle Temple
- Occupation: Judge
- Spouses: Margery Trafford; Joan FitzHerbert
- Children: Sir John Port; Ellen Port; Barbara Port; Maria Port
- Parent(s): Henry Port, Anne Barrow

Sir John Port (c.1472 – c. 14 March 1540), judge, was the son of Henry Port of Chester. He was involved in the trials of Sir Thomas More, John Fisher and Anne Boleyn.

== Family ==
John Port was born about 1472 at Chester, where his ancestors had been merchants for some generations. His father, Henry Porte, was a sheriff of Chester in 1471-2 then mayor of Chester in 1486-7, and his mother, Anne Barrow, was the daughter of Robert Barowe, a sheriff of Chester in 1506-7 then mayor of Chester in 1526-7. Anne Barrow had paternal relatives who also had served as sheriff of Chester previous to her father: Richard Barowe 1445–6, John Barowe 1454–5, John Barowe 1473-4, and Thomas Barowe 1488-9. She also had several paternal relatives who subsequently served as sheriff of Chester: Roger Barowe 1522–3, Robert Barrowe 1528–9 and Thomas Barrowe 1531–2.

== Career ==
By 1495 Port had settled at Etwall in Derbyshire as a result of his marriage to the daughter of John Fitzherbert (d.1502).

Port studied law at the Middle Temple, where he was Reader in 1509, Lent Reader and treasurer in 1515, and governor in 1520. In 1504 he was one of the commissioners appointed to raise a subsidy in Derbyshire. On 2 June 1509 he was made King's solicitor, and on 26 November signed a proclamation as member of the Privy Council. In the same year he was "keeper of the King's books", and in 1511 clerk of the wardrobe. Before 1512 he was appointed attorney to the earldom of Chester, and in that year he appeared as one of the commissioners selected to inquire into the extortions of the masters of the mint.

In 1515 and most succeeding years he served on the commission for the peace in Derbyshire. In 1517 he was clerk of exchange in the Tower, and in 1522 was made serjeant-at-law. He acquired an extensive practice as an advocate, and in 1525 he was made a Justice of the King's Bench and knighted.

He was on the commission for gaol delivery at York, and in June went on the northern circuit as justice of assize. He was also a member of Princess Mary's council. In 1535 he was placed on the commission of oyer and terminer for Middlesex to try John Fisher and Thomas More, and in the following year was similarly employed with regard to Anne Boleyn.

Port died on or about 14 March 1540.

Port's son, John Port the Younger, took a prominent part in the transactions relating to the foundation of Brasenose College, Oxford. He gave to it a garden lying on the south side of the college, and completed John Williamson's bequest of £200 to provide stipends for two sufficient and able persons to read and teach openly in the hall, the one philosophy, the other 'humanity. The stipend was (then) 4 shillings a year, but the limitation to the descendants of Williamson and Port was abolished by Oxford University in 1854. John the Younger was also the founder of Repton School, and the land on which the family Manor House once stood in Etwall is now the grounds of a Secondary School which still holds the Port family crest of three birds within its own school crest.

== Marriages and issue ==
Port married firstly Joan FitzHerbert, widow of John Pole of Radbourne, Derbyshire, and the daughter and coheir of John FitzHerbert (d.1502), King's Remembrancer of the Exchequer, by whom he had a son, Sir John Port, and three daughters:

- Ellen Port, who married firstly Sir Edmund Pierrepont of Holme, Nottinghamshire and secondly Sir John Babington.
- Barbara Port, who married Sir John Francys of Foremark.
- Maria Port, who married Sir George Finderne of Findern.

Port married secondly, in the 1520s, Margery Trafford (d.1540), widow of Sir Thomas Gerard (d. 1523), and daughter of Sir Edmund Trafford of Trafford, Lancashire, by whom he had no issue.
