= St Peter and St Paul's Church, Shelford =

Coordinates: 52°58′29″N 01°00′59″W

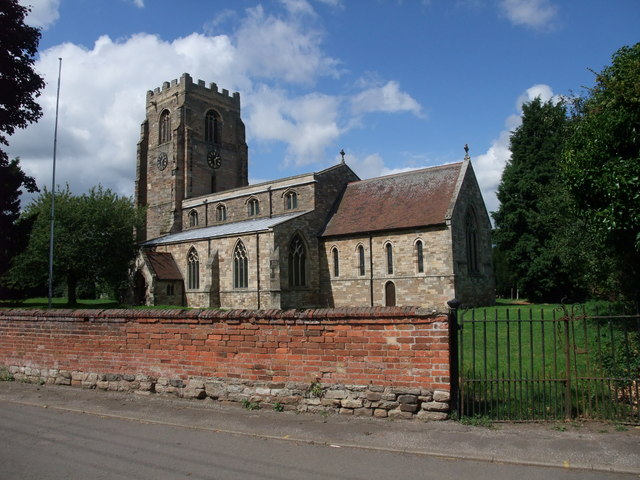
- St Peter and St Paul's Church, Shelford
- St Peter and St Paul's Church, Shelford
- OS grid reference: SK 66171 42359
- Country: England
- Denomination: Church of England
- Churchmanship: Broad Church
- Website: www.stmarysradcliffe.org

History
- Dedication: St Peter and St Paul

Architecture
- Heritage designation: Grade II* listed

Administration
- Province: York
- Diocese: Southwell and Nottingham
- Archdeaconry: Nottingham
- Deanery: East Bingham
- Parish: Shelford, Nottinghamshire

Clergy
- Vicar: interregnum

St Peter and St Paul's Church, Shelford is a parish church in the Church of England in Shelford, Nottinghamshire.

The church is Grade II* listed by the Department for Digital, Culture, Media and Sport.

== History ==
The church is of medieval style and era but was heavily restored between 1876 and 1878 by Ewan Christian. The tower of the church was used by then Royalists during the siege of Shelford Manor during the English Civil War, but they were eventually defeated out by Parliamentarian forces.

It is now part of the united parish of St Mary's Church, Radcliffe on Trent.

== Stained glass ==
There is stained glass in the chancel by Charles Eamer Kempe and in the north aisle by Alexander Gascoyne.

== Organ ==
The earliest mentions of organs is from 1835 when one is recorded in the churchwardens' accounts. A new organ was purchased in 1855 from Henry Bevington of London. This was kept until the end of the 20th century. The current organ was acquired from St Catharine's Church, Nottingham in 2003. It was installed in the church by Henry Groves & Son in 2004.

== Clock ==
An early clock was installed in 1680 by Richard Roe. This was replaced in 1880 by a new clock mechanism by G. & F. Cope of Nottingham.

== Incumbents ==
- William Dracot ca.1610
- Mr Lawe ca.1612
- Matthias Watson 1617–1622
- Humphrey Saunders by 1624–1630
- Henry Pratt 1630–1638
- William Evatt 1638–1639
- Ralph Browne ca.1640
- Robert Heath 1650–1667
- Mr Ouslay 1667–1668
- Joseph Hawkins 1669–1711
- Edward Hawkins 1711–1716
- Thomas Price 1716–1725
- Gabriel Wayne 1726–1771
- William Kirkby 1772–1782
- Thomas Bigsby 1783–1811
- John Davenport 1812–1827
- John Rolleston 1828–1854
- Thomas Hassall 1854–1856
- Henry Alexander 1859–1874
- William James Bethell Wynn Roberts 1875–1877
- Herbert Guilford Sprigg 1878–1880
- Christopher Rodwell 1880–1882
- Edward St John Morse 1882–1940
- William Wheeler 1944–1946
- Albert Boultby 1946–1948
- Arthur Elwin 1948–1951
- Noel King 1953–1955
- Thomas Warner Richardson 1957–1965
- George John Halsey 1966–1968
- Stephen Chaloner 1969–1973
- Gerald Nettleton Pearce 1973–1984
- Kenneth H. Newcombe 1984–1997
- Neil Weston 1998–2009
- Graeme Anderson 2009–2016

== Memorials ==
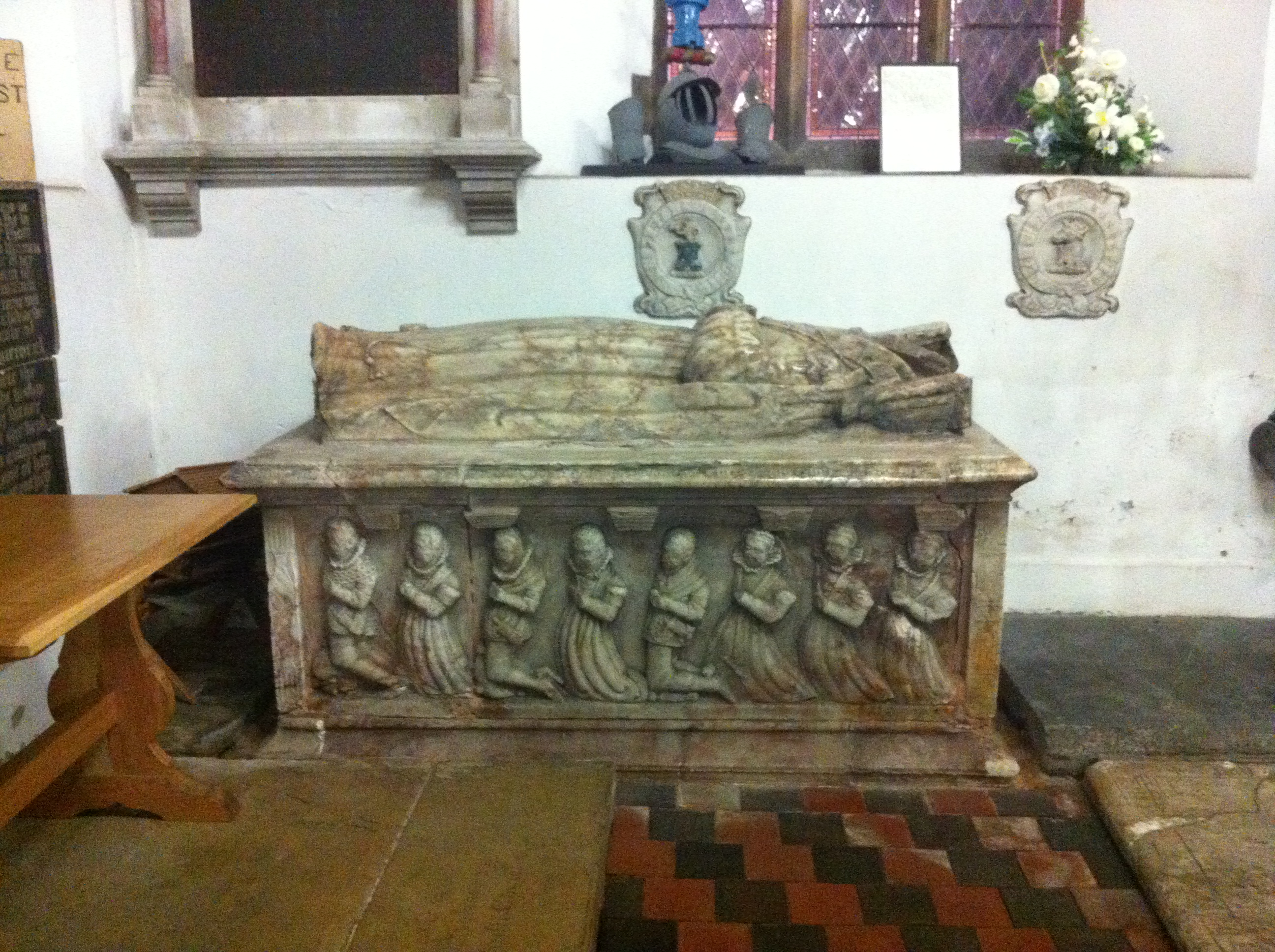
Memorial to Lady Anne Stanhope

- Lady Anne Stanhope, died 1587
- Lady Georgina West, died 1824

== See also ==
- Grade II* listed buildings in Nottinghamshire
- Listed buildings in Shelford, Nottinghamshire
