= St Helen's Church, Etwall =

St Helen’s Church, Etwall
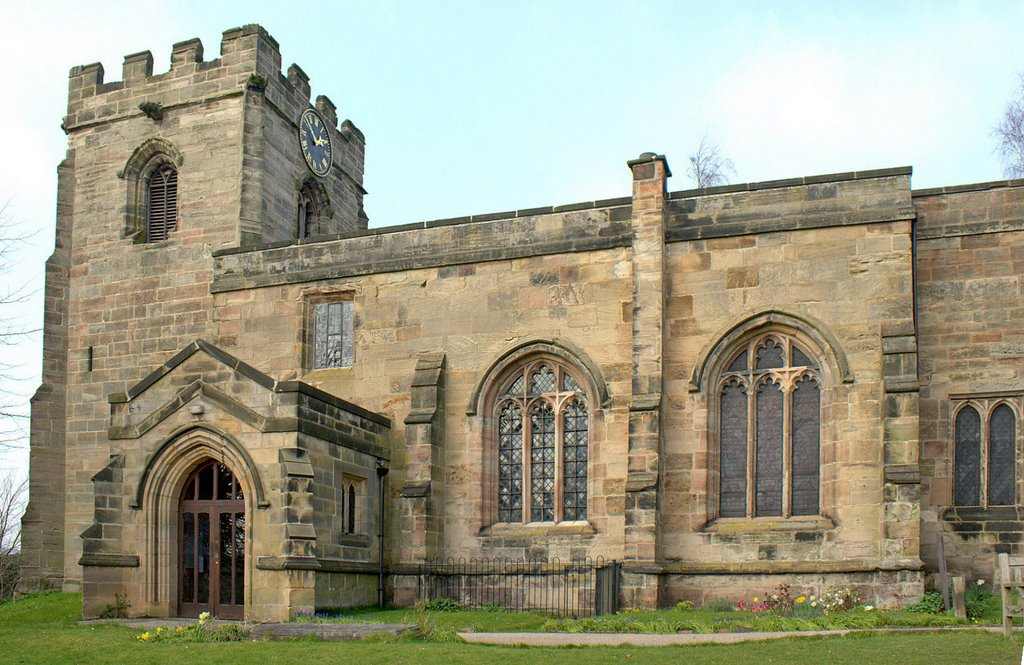
- St Helen’s Church, Etwall
- St Helen’s Church, Etwall
- 52°53′4.96″N 1°36′6.71″W
- Location: Etwall
- Country: England
- Denomination: Church of England

History
- Dedication: St Helen

Architecture
- Heritage designation: Grade I listed

Administration
- Province: Province of Canterbury
- Diocese: Diocese of Derby
- Archdeaconry: Derby
- Deanery: Longford
- Parish: Etwall

Clergy
- Vicar: Stella Greenwood

St Helen's Church, Etwall is a Grade I listed parish church in the Church of England in Etwall, Derbyshire.

== History ==
The church dates from the 12th century with elements from the 15th, 16th and 17th centuries.

The church was restored between 1881 and 1882 by Frederick Josias Robinson of Derby. The plastered ceiling was taken down. The stone walls and columns were stripped of their plaster. The chancel arch was cut through, and the square pews were replaced with open pitch pine seating. Minton tiles were laid throughout and central heating installed. A new pulpit was provided by C.E. Newton of Mickleover Manor. It was made by Walker and Slater of Derby with alabaster slabs found in the floor of the church, with columns and medallions of red royal marble. The contractor for the general work was Robert Young of Lincoln.

It reopened on 2 February 1882

== Organ ==
The organ was by W Hawkins of Walsall Wood and installed in 1976. A specification of the organ can be found on the National Pipe Organ Register. It was replaced by an electronic in 1990. A brand new 3 manual organ made by Viscount was installed in January 2018.

== Gallery ==
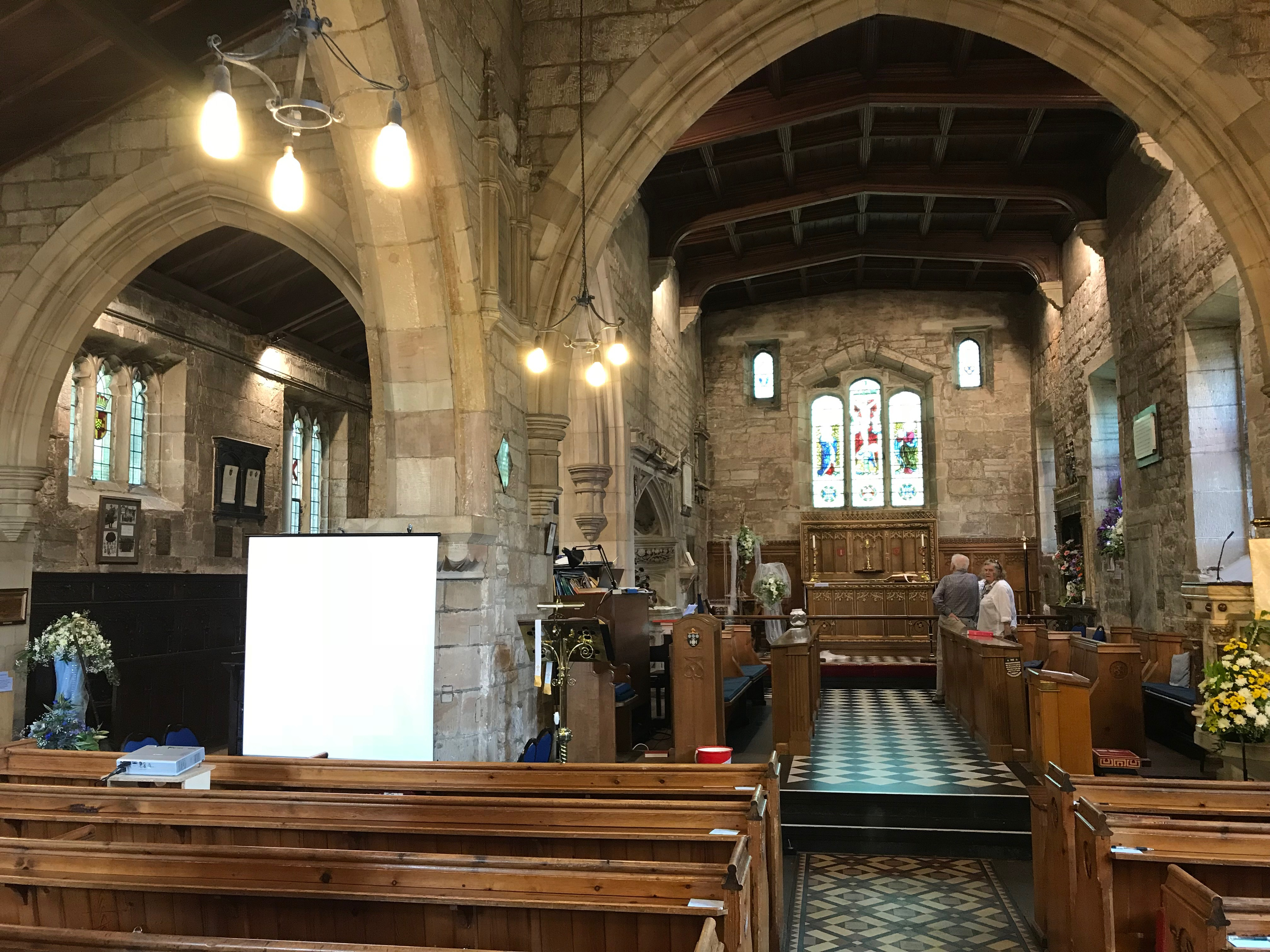
Inside, taken 19 May 2018

== Parish status ==
The church is in a joint parish with:

- St Wilfrid's Church, Egginton

== See also ==
- Grade I listed churches in Derbyshire
- Grade I listed buildings in Derbyshire
- Listed buildings in Etwall
