= John Port Spencer Academy =

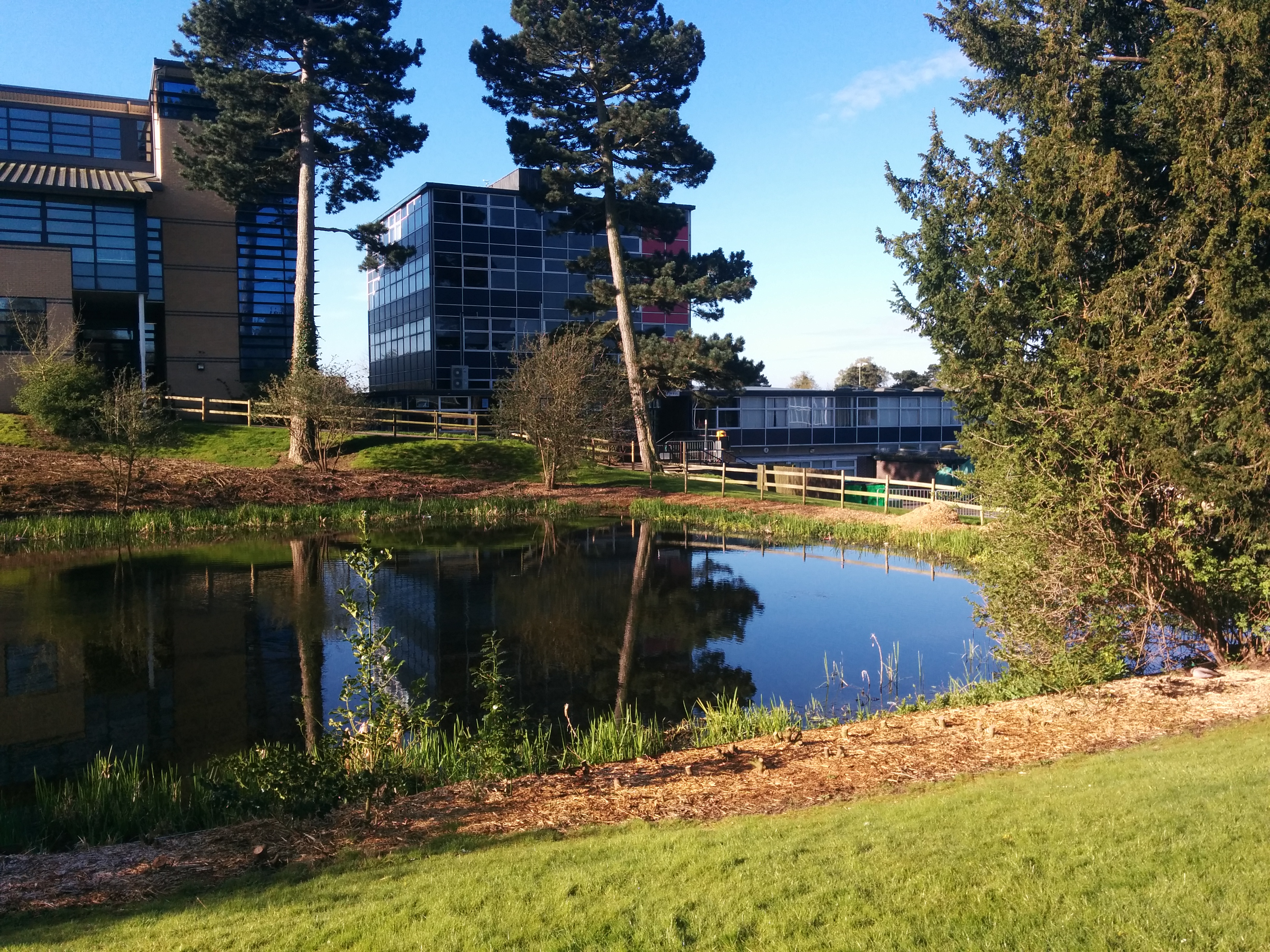

Location
- Main Street; Etwall, Derbyshire, DE65 6LU; England; 52°53′04″N 1°36′10″W

Information
- Type: Academy
- Motto: Excellence in Everything
- Established: 1956
- Department for Education URN: 145500 Tables
- Ofsted: Reports
- Principal: Laura O’Leary
- Gender: Coeducational
- Age: 11 to 18
- Enrolment: 2,100
- Colour: Oxford blue
- Website: http://www.johnport.derbyshire.sch.uk/

John Port Spencer Academy, formerly known as John Port School, is an academy and secondary school in the village of Etwall, Derbyshire, England.

== Admissions ==
The academy is the largest secondary school in Derbyshire, and one of the largest nationally, with approximately 2,100 students enrolled.

It is a mixed gender school, with student ages ranging between 11 and 18, including sixth form students between 16 and 18.

There are approximately 141 full-time and temporary members of the teaching staff. The current head-teacher is Laura O’Leary.

== History ==
The school sits on the site of a demolished country manor, Etwall Hall, traditionally of the Port family who were the wealthy landowners/farmers of the parish. In 1952, the Derbyshire County Council bought Etwall Hall from Reg Parnell, the famous racing car driver. The hall had been used during the Second World War by the British Army, first as a petrol depot and later as an equipment supply centre and been left in a somewhat dilapidated state. After its demolition a secondary modern, Etwall Secondary School, and a secondary grammar school, John Port Grammar School, were built on the site. In 1965 they were amalgamated to form the John Port School that occupies the site today.

The name of the Port family, who lived at the hall, has been associated with Etwall since the 15th century. The family's most famous son, Sir John Port, was the founder of the nearby Repton School and committed to the furthering of education for young men in the village. It therefore seemed entirely appropriate that the new school was named after him.

== School site ==
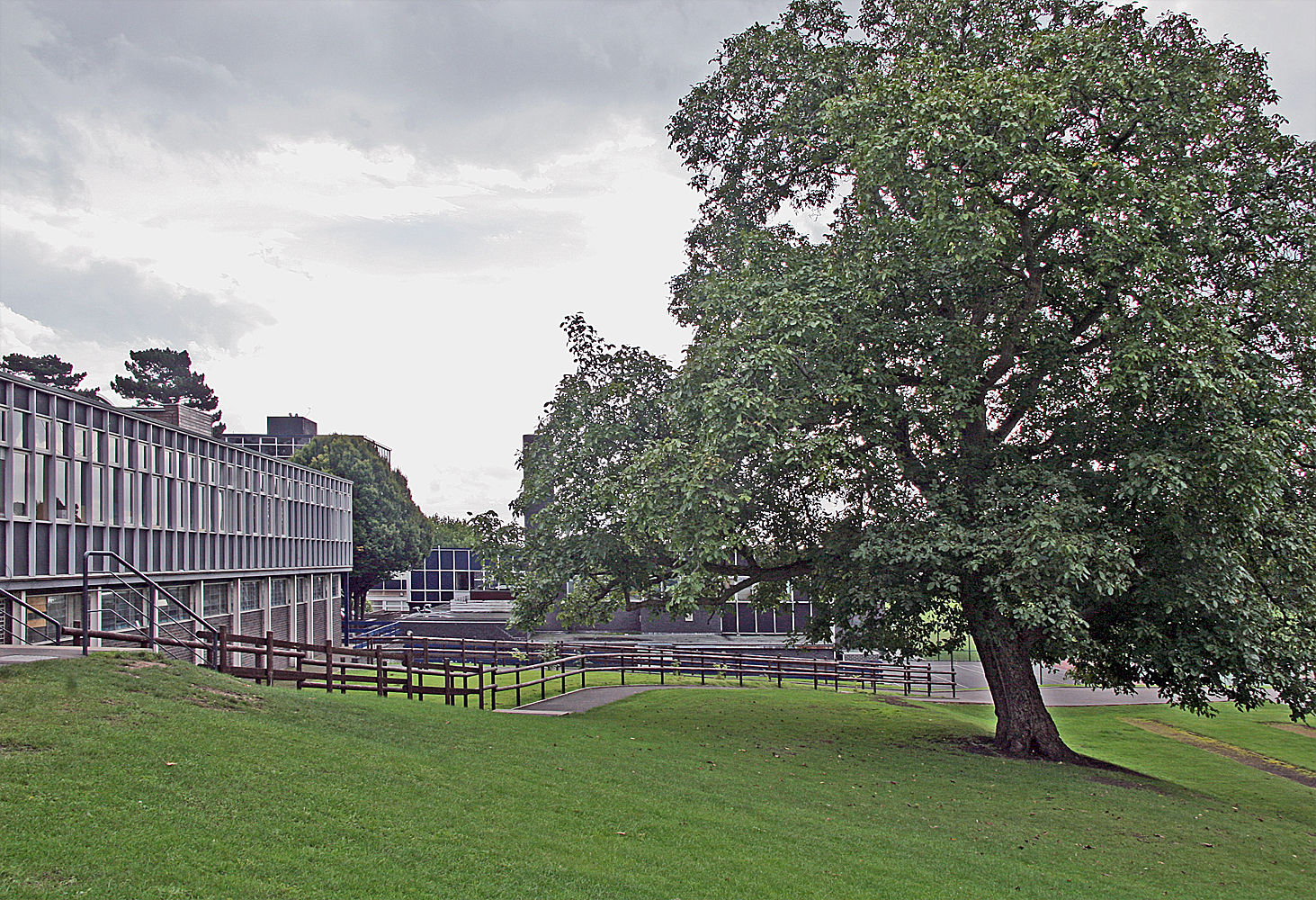
A green site

The large site has green open spaces between the individual teaching facilities. The centre of the site is focussed around the lake, one of the original fishing ponds that were in the grounds of the Etwall Hall.

Teaching facilities are spread across the site, with each faculty having a separate building. The buildings are mostly named after settlements and features in Derbyshire and the Peak District, with the exceptions to this being Flamsteed, named after a famous local scientist John Flamsteed, and the Jubilee Centre, named to commemorate the Diamond Jubilee of Queen Elizabeth II.

The Learning Resources Centre is situated centrally on the site, occupying most of the ground floor of 'Bakewell' block.

The site is also home to the Etwall Leisure Centre, with public access from Hilton Road. This new centre was officially opened on 17 July 2009, although it didn't open to the public till 5 August 2009. The new facilities include a six-lane 25 m swimming pool, squash courts, fitness suite and large sports hall.

== School performance ==
The school was inspected in May 2022 and was rated as “good” by Ofsted.

== Notable students ==
- Kaide Gordon – professional footballer
- Mel Morris – businessman
- David Willey – American physics populariser

=== John Port Grammar School ===
- Sir Howard Newby (1959–66) – sociologist, former head of the Economic and Social Research Council University Vice-Chancellor at Southampton, UWE and currently Liverpool

== Catchment area ==
The size of the school means that it has a very large catchment area, covering 31 parishes of South Derbyshire, and includes the following primary schools:

1. Church Broughton Primary School
2. Egginton Primary School
3. Etwall Primary School
4. Heathfields Primary School
5. Findern Primary School
6. Hilton Primary School
7. Longford Primary School
8. Long Lane Primary School
9. Mickleover Primary School
10. Ravensdale Primary School
11. Repton Primary School
12. Silverhill Primary School
13. Sudbury Primary School
14. St Clare Special Needs School
15. Willington Primary School
