= Shelford, Nottinghamshire =

Village and civil parish in Nottinghamshire, England

Coordinates: 52.974°N 1.016°W

Shelford
- Village and civil parish
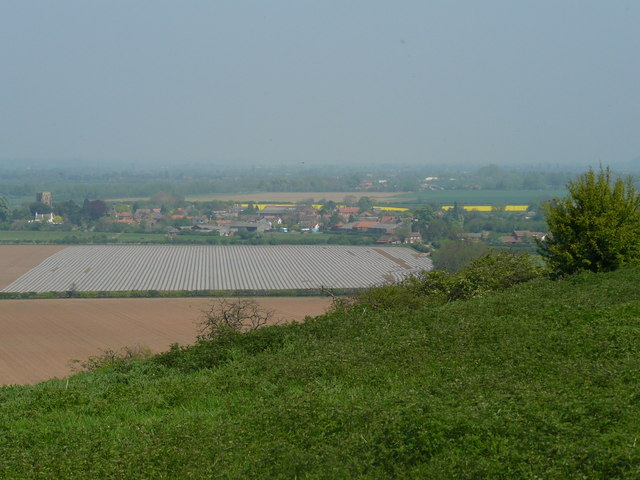
- View of Shelford, taken from Gibbet Hill

- Location within Nottinghamshire
- Interactive map of Shelford
- Area: 3.33 sq mi (8.6 km^{2})
- Population: 267 (2021)
  - Density: 80/sq mi (31/km^{2})
- OS grid reference: SK 662422
  - London: 105 mi (169 km) SSE
- District: Rushcliffe
- Shire county: Nottinghamshire
- Region: East Midlands
- Country: England
- Sovereign state: United Kingdom
- Post town: NOTTINGHAM
- Postcode district: NG12
- Dialling code: 0115
- Police: Nottinghamshire
- Fire: Nottinghamshire
- Ambulance: East Midlands
- UK Parliament: Rushcliffe
- Website: www.shelfordnotts.org

Shelford is a village and civil parish in the Rushcliffe borough of Nottinghamshire. The population of the former civil parish of Shelford and Newton at the 2011 census was 673. Shelford has since been created as a separate parish which counted 267 residents at the 2021 census. It is near Radcliffe on Trent. It has an old manor house (built on the site of Shelford Priory), a church, a caravan park and bar. It also has a pub restaurant, The Earl of Chesterfield Arms.

Several small farms operate in the village, engaging in arable and livestock farming, with much of the harvesting being contracted out to outside companies.

== Toponymy ==
Shelford contains the Old English word scelde for shallowness; perhaps also a shallow place, + ford (Old English), a ford, so "Shallow ford".

== History ==
It was the location of Shelford Priory, a former Augustinian house. The priory was founded by Ralph Haunselyn around 1160–80 and dissolved in 1536.

The village was the scene of a battle in the English Civil War when the Royalist garrison of Shelford Manor was taken on 3 November 1645. A re-enactment of this battle takes place periodically by the Sealed Knot, a civil war re-enactment society. Held over a weekend, the activities centre upon West and Church Streets, the church and finally the manor house.

== Geography ==
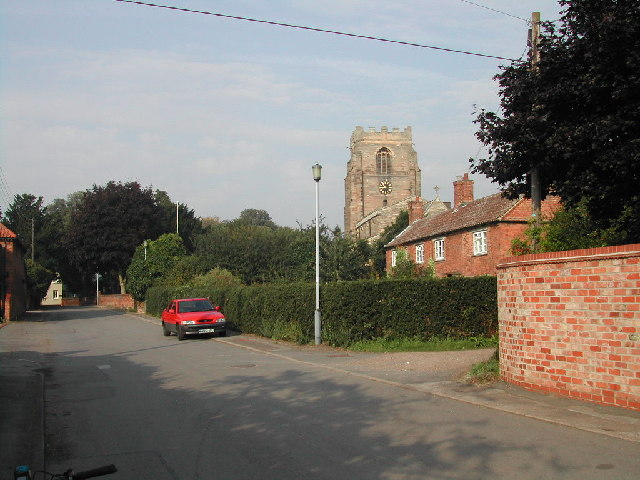
Church Street, Shelford

On the floor of the Trent Valley, Shelford is protected from flooding by flood protection controls. This renders the probability of flooding very low. Even in the floods of 2000, the rising waters did not impinge upon the housing in the village.

== Events ==
Every second year the village hosts a feast weekend, which features a street market, events and other activities, centred on the church and village hall. This event is attended by both villagers and visitors from nearby towns and villages. Over the weekend some houses open their gardens for a small donation to charity.

== Transport ==
The village had a ferry which ran between Shelford and Stoke Bardolph, but this has long since disappeared. The wooden structure tethering the rope for pulling the ferry can still be seen today at the end of Stoke Ferry Lane.

The vernacular of the village is red brick and red pantile, with the "important" buildings under slate.

== See also ==
- Listed buildings in Shelford, Nottinghamshire
