= Percival Hart (16th-century MP) =

English politician

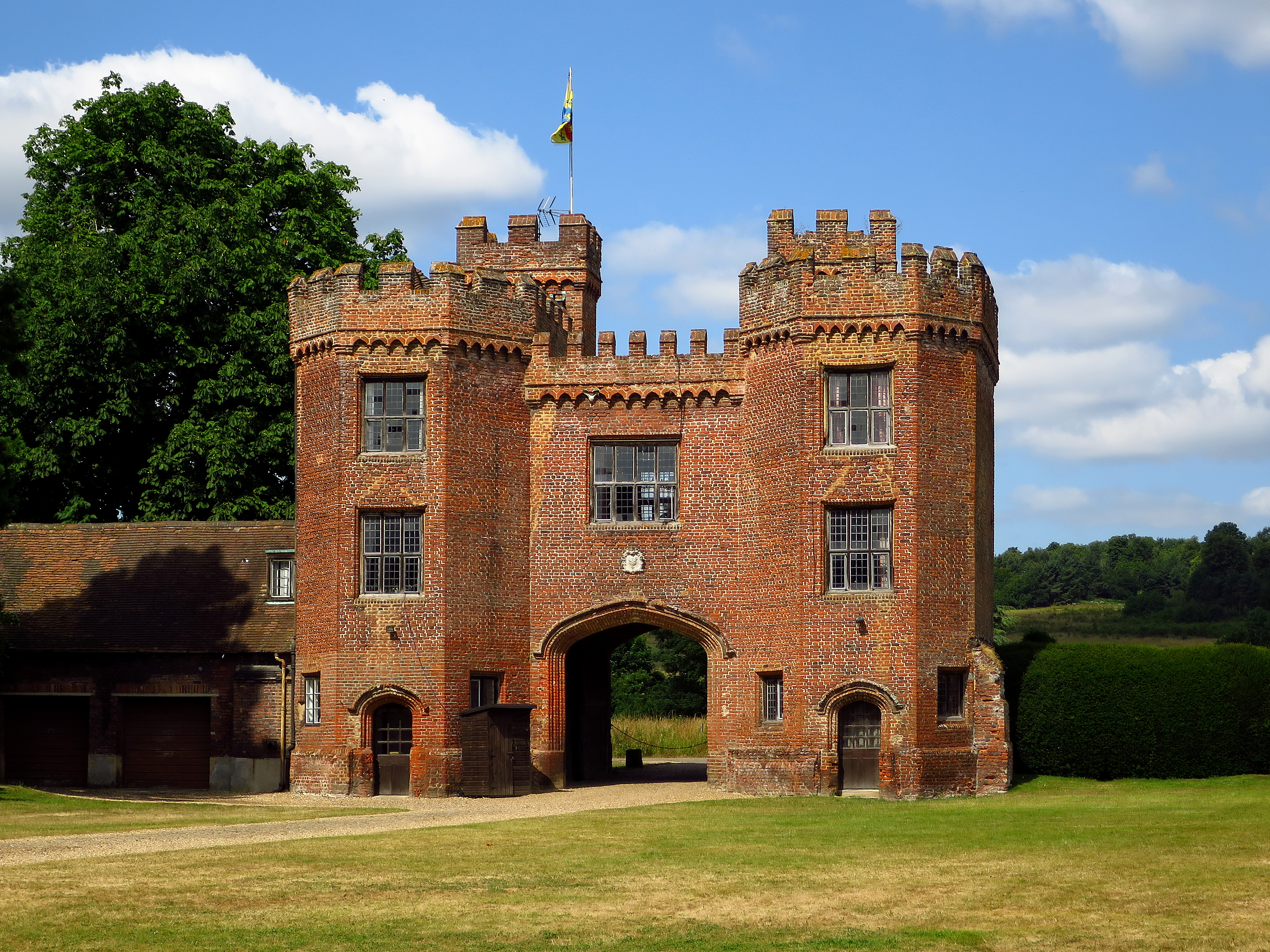
Gatehouse of Lullingstone Castle- seat of the Hart family

Sir Percival Hart (14 January 1569 – 8 March 1642) of Lullingstone Castle, Kent was an English politician.

== Career ==
Hart was the eldest surviving son of Sir George Hart of Lullingstone. He married Anne Manwood (daughter of Roger Manwood), Jane Stanhope (daughter of Sir Edward Stanhope (died 1603)), then Mary Morrison. He was educated at New College, Oxford (1584) and Gray's Inn (1602).

Hart was Member of Parliament for Kent in 1598 following the death of William Brooke in a duel and for Lewes in 1601. He was knighted in 1601. In May 1603 he sent fish and poultry from the Lullingstone estate to King James at Theobalds.

== Marriages and family ==
In a double marriage ceremony on 10 January 1587 in Hackington, Kent he married Anne, daughter of Sir Roger Manwood, while his bride's brother Peter Manwood married Hart's sister Francis Hart. Following Anne's death, Hart married secondly, Jane, daughter of Edward Stanhope.

He had at least 2 sons and a daughter and was succeeded by William, his eldest son by his first wife. His second son was Sir Henry Hart, whose son Sir Percival Hart afterwards inherited Lullingstone Castle on William's childless death.
