= John Port (died 1557) =

English politician (1510–1557)

Sir John Port
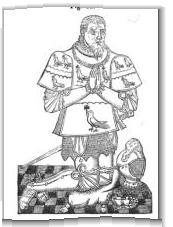
- Born: before 1510
- Died: 6 June 1557
- Education: Brasenose College, Oxford
- Spouses: Elizabeth Giffard; Dorothy Fitzherbert
- Children: Walter Port; Thomas Port; Elizabeth Port; Dorothy Port; Margaret Port
- Parent(s): Sir John Port, Jane Fitzherbert

Sir John Port (before 1510 – 6 June 1557) was an English landowner and Knight of the Order of the Bath who served occasionally in the House of Commons. He was High Sheriff of Derbyshire in 1554. By his will, he founded Repton School and almshouses at Etwall. He also owned Caverswall Castle from 1531 after acquiring it through marriage to Elizabeth Giffard.

The John Port Spencer Academy at Etwall is named after him.

== Early life ==
Port's ancestors were from Chester. He was the only son of Sir John Port (died 1540), a judge, by Jane Fitzherbert (died about 1520), the widow of John Pole of Radbourne, and daughter and heiress of John Fitzherbert (died 1502) of Etwall, King's Remembrancer of the Exchequer. His great-grandfather, Henry Port, was described as a merchant. A London mercer, also named Henry Port (died 1512), was his grandfather; a monument to the latter in St Helen's Church, Etwall records that he died in 1512, having had seventeen children by his wife Elizabeth, the daughter of Banowayte of Flowresbrook.

Port had three sisters: Ellen, who married firstly Sir Edmund Pierrepont of Holme, Nottinghamshire, and secondly Sir John Babington; Barbara, who married Sir John Francys of Foremark; and Maria, who was the wife of Sir George Findern of Findern.

Port was the first lecturer or scholar at his father's foundation at Brasenose College.

== Career ==
In 1539, Port was elected as one of the Knights of the Shire (members of parliament) for Derbyshire. He was knighted at the coronation of King Edward VI in 1547 and was a member of Queen Mary I's first parliament, representing Derbyshire in 1553. He was High Sheriff of Derbyshire in 1554. In 1556 he was involved in the execution of Joan Waste, a 22-year-old blind Protestant.

== Bequests ==
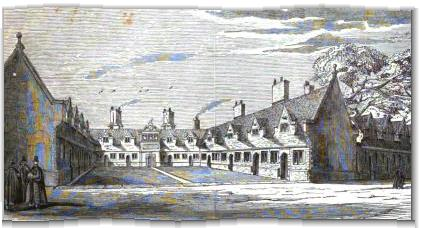
Etwall Hospital

Port had no surviving sons when he died on 6 June 1557. By his will he left bequests for the creation of an almshouse at Etwall and a "Grammar School in Etwalle or Reptone", where the scholars every day were to pray for the souls of his parents and other relatives. The executors purchased land which had once been the grounds of the Augustinian Repton Priory. The priory had been dissolved in 1538, however the buildings remained standing until 1553 when the then owner, Gilbert Thacker, fearing the priory would be recommissioned under the Roman Catholic Queen Mary I, had the church completely destroyed; a task that was almost entirely completed within a single day. Gilbert Thacker claimed "He would destroy the nest, for fear the birds should build therein again." Thus only a few fragments and foundations of the original priory church remain, although other buildings survived and are now part of Repton School. Port also confirmed and augmented his father's grants to Brasenose College, Oxford.

== Marriages and children ==
Port married firstly Elizabeth Giffard, a daughter of Sir Thomas Giffard of Chillington in Staffordshire by Dorothy, his wife, third daughter and co-heiress of Sir John Montgomery, which Elizabeth was heiress to her mother. By his first wife he had three daughters and two sons:

- Walter Port, who died young.
- Thomas Port, who died young.
- Elizabeth Port, who married Sir Thomas Gerrard of Bryn Hall, ancestor of the baronets of that name.
- Dorothy Port, who married George Hastings, 4th Earl of Huntingdon.
- Margaret Port, who married Sir Thomas Stanhope, grandfather of Philip Stanhope, 1st Earl of Chesterfield.

Port married secondly Dorothy Fitzherbert, widow of Sir Ralph Longford (d. 1543) and daughter of Sir Anthony Fitzherbert of Norbury, Derbyshire, by whom he had no issue.
