= Etwall =

Village in Derbyshire, England

Coordinates: 52.884°N 1.602°W

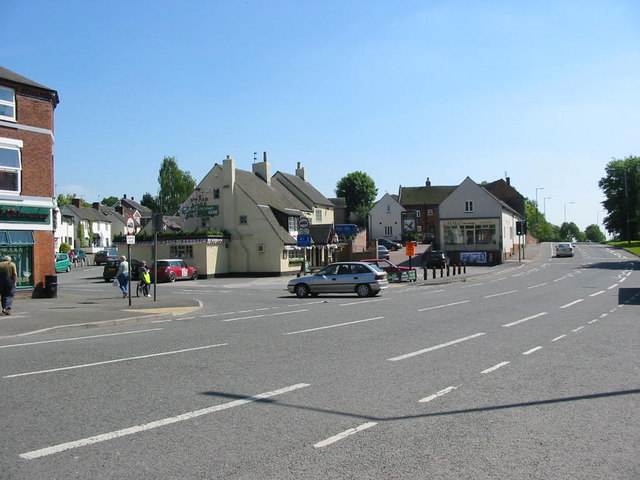
- Centre of Etwall

- Location within Derbyshire
- Population: 2,906 (2011)
- OS grid reference: SK268319
- District: South Derbyshire
- Shire county: Derbyshire
- Region: East Midlands
- Country: England
- Sovereign state: United Kingdom
- Post town: DERBY
- Postcode district: DE65
- Police: Derbyshire
- Fire: Derbyshire
- Ambulance: East Midlands

Etwall is a village and civil parish in the South Derbyshire district of Derbyshire, England, southwest of Derby on the A50. The population at the 2011 Census was 2,906.

== Geography ==
Etwall is located between the A516 bypass and the A50 in south Derbyshire. The A516 draws heavy traffic heading for the M1 north.

The village has its own public library, several schools including a state pre-school, state primary, an independent day school and the large secondary school, John Port Spencer Academy. The parish church is St Helen's. A war memorial is located in the shadow of a memorial tree which was planted in the 1800s.

There is also a Buddhist centre at Ashe Hall established by Kelsang Gyatso. Some of the inhabitants work at the Toyota car factory which is located east of the village. The part of the village that is closely adjacent to the A50, and the Toyota Car factory, is separately named as Etwall Common.

== History ==
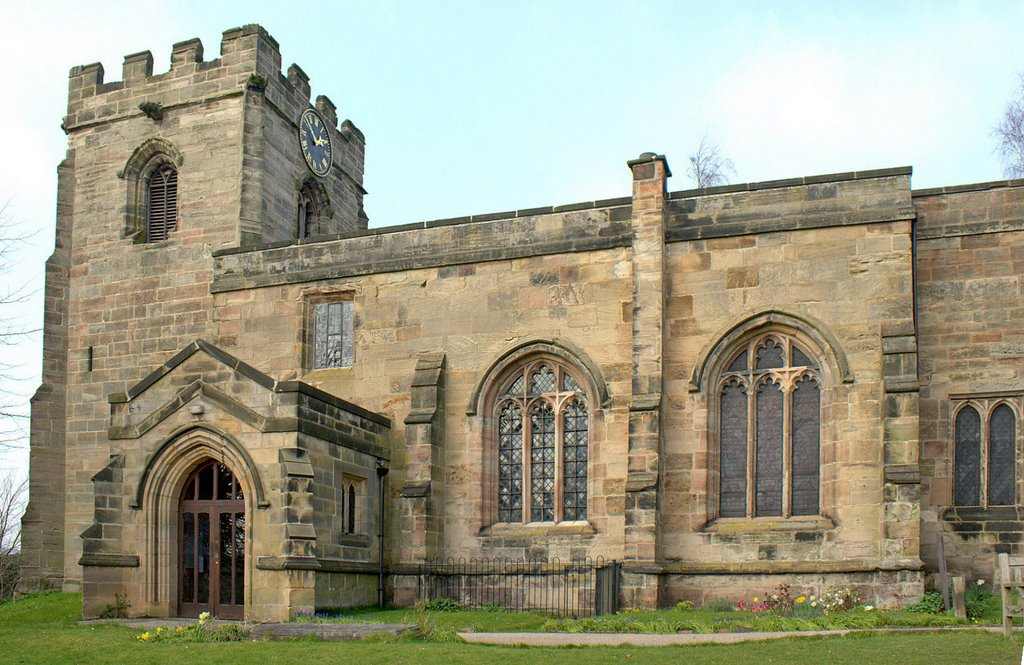
St Helen’s Church

The village name comes from Etewelle, meaning "Eatta’s water", Eatta being a 7th-century Saxon leader. Etwall is famous for its well dressing festival every May.

The John Port Grammar School opened in 1956, with the Etwall Secondary School on the same site. They combined as the comprehensive John Port School in 1965.

== Amenities ==
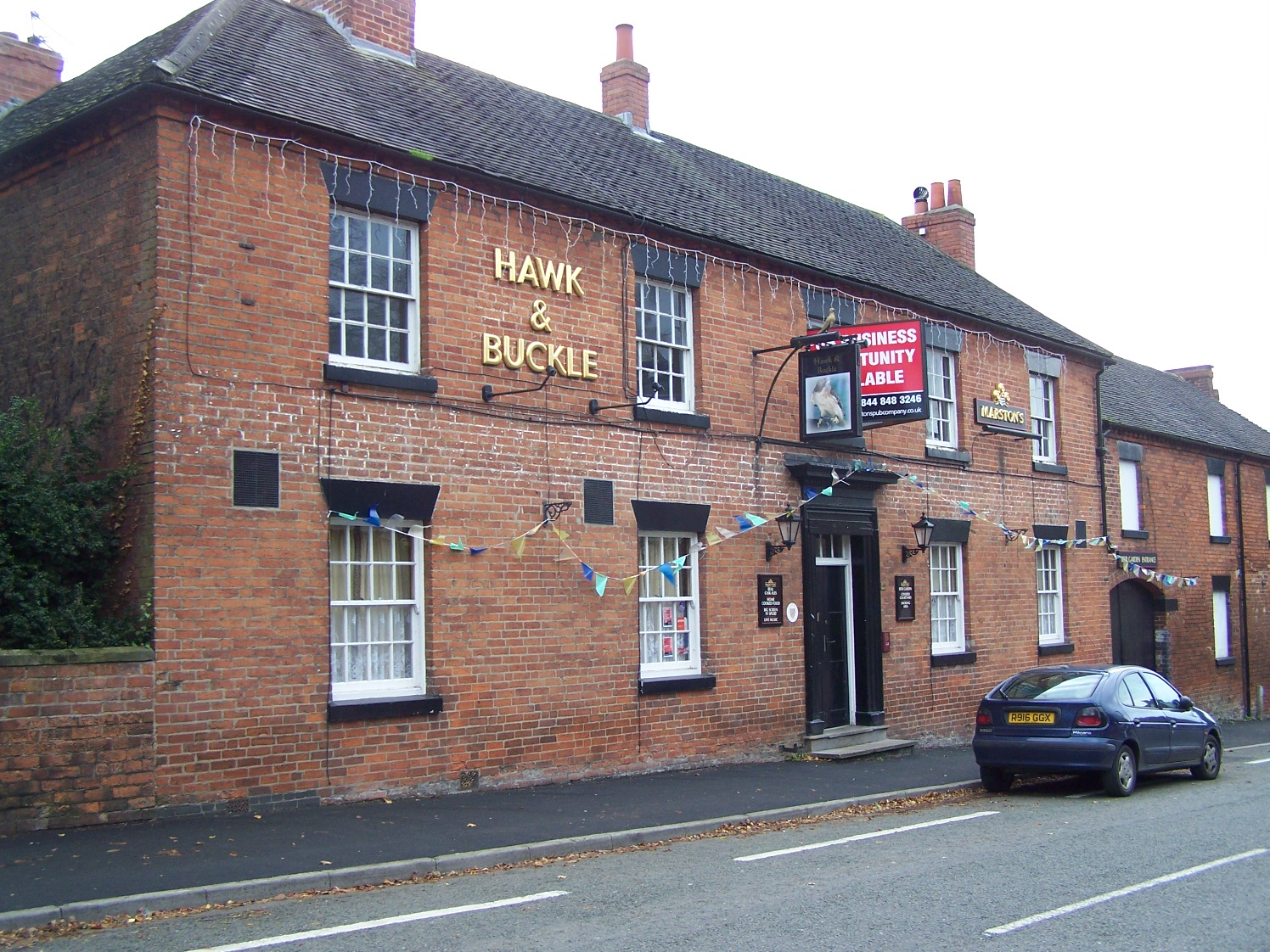
The Hawk & Buckle

Etwall has numerous amenities including a post office, library, two village stores, a restaurant, pharmacy, dental practice, veterinarian, village hall, leisure centre and cricket club. Etwall also has a swimming club, tennis club and the Team FS Derby, a Futsal Club of the FA National Futsal League.

The village has two pubs on its Main Street: the Spread Eagle (opposite John Port School) is the oldest, and the Hawk and Buckle dates from around 1800. There is also the more modern Seven Wells on Heage Lane and a bar inside Blenheim House.

The King George playing fields host the local football team Kings Head F.C. (sponsored by the Kings Head of Hilton) on Sunday mornings. The village is also served by a modern community centre/village hall named after the former primary school caretaker Frank Wickham, which hosts community events and also is used as a polling station for local and general elections.

Three National Cycle Network routes meeting in the village: Route 54, Route 549 and Route 68.

During the period 2015–2017 and beyond Etwall is due to have new building work on former John Port Trust land, which was left in trust and rented to local farmers. This marks the biggest expansion of Etwall village since post-war building in the 1950s and 1960s by Wimpey builders, and is due to expand the village's housing stock and increase local amenities.

18.4% of South Derbyshire's Band E to H properties are located in Etwall, with 12 out of 81 of the council's band H properties located in the village.

== Former residents ==
- Sir John Port (judge) (1480–1541), judge, born in Chester, lived in Etwall
- Sir John Port (died 1557), son of above, born in Etwall, founded Repton School
- John Gerard, S.J., recusant priest
- Miles Hunt
- Debbie McGee

== See also ==
- Listed buildings in Etwall
