= Battle of Sherburn in Elmet =

Action fought towards the end of the First English Civil War

Coordinates: 53.795°N 1.262°W

- Part of First English Civil War
Date	15 October 1645
Location	Sherburn in Elmet, Yorkshire, England
Result	Parliamentarian victory

Belligerents
Royalists	Parliamentarians

Commanders and leaders
Lord Digby; Sir Marmaduke Langdale	Sydnam Poyntz

Strength
1,600	1,250

Casualties and losses
40 killed 300–400 prisoners	10 killed

The Battle of Sherburn in Elmet was an action fought towards the end of the First English Civil War. A detachment of the English Royalist army led by Lord Digby, King Charles I's Secretary of State, was making a belated attempt to reach Scotland and join forces with the Scottish Royalists. As they moved north through Yorkshire, they were pursued by a Parliamentarian force under Sydnam Poyntz. Poyntz was unaware of the Royalists' position, and the Royalists took the opportunity to ambush and attack a small Parliamentarian detachment at night in the village of Sherburn in Elmet. However, the Royalists then mistook fleeing Parliamentarians for their own men and panicked. In the ensuing flight, several hundred Royalist prisoners were taken. The Parliamentarians also captured Digby's coach, which contained much compromising correspondence.

== Background ==
In 1645 the Royalist cause suffered a series of disasters. On 14 June, the Parliamentarian New Model Army destroyed the King's main "Oxford Army" at the Battle of Naseby. The New Model Army then defeated the Royalist "Western Army" under Lord Goring at the Battle of Langport and stormed Bristol on 10 September. On 24 September, the King attempted to relieve Chester but was defeated at the Battle of Rowton Heath.

For much of 1645, one of the King's objectives had been to join forces with the Scottish Royalists under the Marquess of Montrose. The Scottish Covenanters had intervened on the side of the Parliamentarians in late 1643, and had been instrumental in the victory at the Battle of Marston Moor, which gained them supremacy in the north of England. In late 1644 and early 1645, Montrose had won several victories over the Covenanters which eventually put Scotland at his mercy. He then tried to reach England but was defeated at the Battle of Philiphaugh on 13 September. This cost him the hard core of his army, who were slaughtered after laying down their arms. Montrose escaped the battlefield, and tried to raise another army from among some of the Highland clans.

Following his defeat at Rowton Heath, the King had retreated with his remaining 2,400 cavalry to Denbigh. From there, he proceeded east into England, arriving at the Royalist stronghold of Newark-on-Trent on 4 October. On 12 October he left, intending to move north to join Montrose. On 13 October, he held a council of war at Welbeck. Most of the officers who attended were opposed to continuing the march, but the King overruled them. However, the very next day, he received the news of Montrose's defeat at Philiphaugh. The victorious Covenanter cavalry under Sir David Leslie were moving back into the Scottish Borders while the main Covenanter army under the Earl of Leven were on the River Tees, blocking the route north.

== Royalist moves ==
As the King could no longer rely on Montrose to reinforce him, he abandoned the march north. However, in a reversal of previous roles, he decided to send a substantial force of cavalry north to reinforce Montrose. This consisted of 1,600 "Northern Horse" under Sir Marmaduke Langdale. The "Northern Horse" were cavalry raised in the North of England, who had continued fighting for the King even after their homes and estates were occupied by Covenanters and Parliamentarians after the battle of Marston Moor. Since then, they had been involved in the King's defeats at the battles of Naseby and Rowton Heath and had gained a reputation for pillage and poor discipline.

The King appointed his Secretary of State, Lord Digby, to be Lieutenant General of all the Royalist forces north of the River Trent and made him the overall leader of the expedition to the north. Digby had been blamed for many unwise decisions taken by the King's council of war since 1643 and had quarrelled with Prince Rupert of the Rhine, the King's nephew and chief field commander. However, Rupert was in disfavour since the fall of Bristol, which the King considered Rupert to have surrendered prematurely.

== Parliamentarian moves ==
Early in 1645, when Parliament had created the New Model Army, they had also consolidated their forces in the north of England into the Army of the "Northern Association", consisting of five regiments of cavalry, one regiment of dragoons and seven regiments of infantry. On 25 July, they appointed Sydnam Poyntz (sometimed spelled "Sydenham Poyntz") as commander of this army. Poyntz was a professional soldier who had served with Dutch and Swedish armies in Europe, and had entered Parliament's service in 1644. (Not being a peer or member of Parliament, he was not bound by the Self-denying Ordinance.) While the New Model Army was engaged in the West country, Poyntz had shadowed the King's army with a cavalry force and had won the battle of Rowton Heath.

Poyntz was still following the King's army, but lacked information on his intentions. In light of the scarce intelligence available, he proceeded northward and found himself near Digby's troops as he approached Sherburn in Elmet on 15 October.

== Action ==
After setting out for Scotland, Digby first attacked a Parliamentarian detachment at Doncaster, and another at Cusworth. In and around Sherburn in Elmet was a Parliamentarian infantry regiment of almost 1,000 men commanded by Colonel Wren. These were apparently taken by surprise and forced to surrender. As the Royalists disarmed their prisoners, the Royalists learned that a Parliamentarian cavalry regiment commanded by Colonel Copley was riding to Wren's aid.

Langdale, with about half the Royalist force, drew up his men and delivered a stirring speech before engaging Copley. Initially, Langdale's men gained the upper hand, but as some of Copley's troopers panicked and fled through the village of Sherburn in Elmet, they were mistaken for fleeing Royalists. Either Digby or some of his ill disciplined troops also panicked and fled. Meanwhile, a second Parliamentarian cavalry regiment under John Lilburne arrived to support Copley. Langdale's men were overcome by superior numbers. The Parliamentarians followed up, and released Wren's men and recovered their abandoned weapons.

== Casualties ==
The Parliamentarians admitted to only 10 men killed. They claimed to have killed 40 Royalists and taken 300 to 400 prisoners. They also reported capturing 600 horses. Only 600 Royalists escaped the battle and reached the Royalist garrison at Skipton.

== Aftermath ==
The Parliamentarians also captured Digby's coach, which contained the Secretary of State's correspondence. This was sent to London to be scrutinised by a Parliamentary committee before being handed to the Covenanters.

The survivors of Digby's and Langdale's force were pursued to Skipton, and then across the Pennines into Cumberland. They reached Scotland but were defeated again at Annan Moor. Finally, the remnants were defeated on Carlisle Sands on 24 October by Parliamentarians commanded by Sir John Browne. Digby and Langdale escaped to the Isle of Man.

== Sources ==
=== Printed sources ===
- Rogers, Colonel H.C.B. (1968), Battles and Generals of the Civil Wars, London: Seeley Service & Co. Ltd, OCLC 38806
- Young, Peter (1970). Marston Moor 1644: The Campaign and the Battle. Kineton: Roundwood. ISBN 1-900624-09-5.

=== External links ===
- Turnbull, M. (15 October 2020). "Battle of Sherburn-in-Elmet, Yorkshire - 15th October 1645". www.allegianceofblood.com.
- Plant, David (2001). "Sir Marmaduke Langdale, 1st Baron Langdale, 1598-1661". bcw-project.org.
