= Rowton Hall Hotel =

Building in Cheshire, England

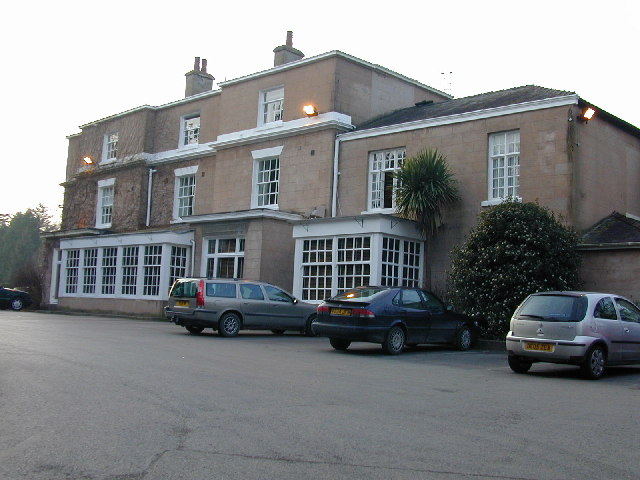

- Location within Cheshire

General information
- Location: Rowton, Cheshire, England
- Coordinates: 53°10′22″N 2°49′48″W

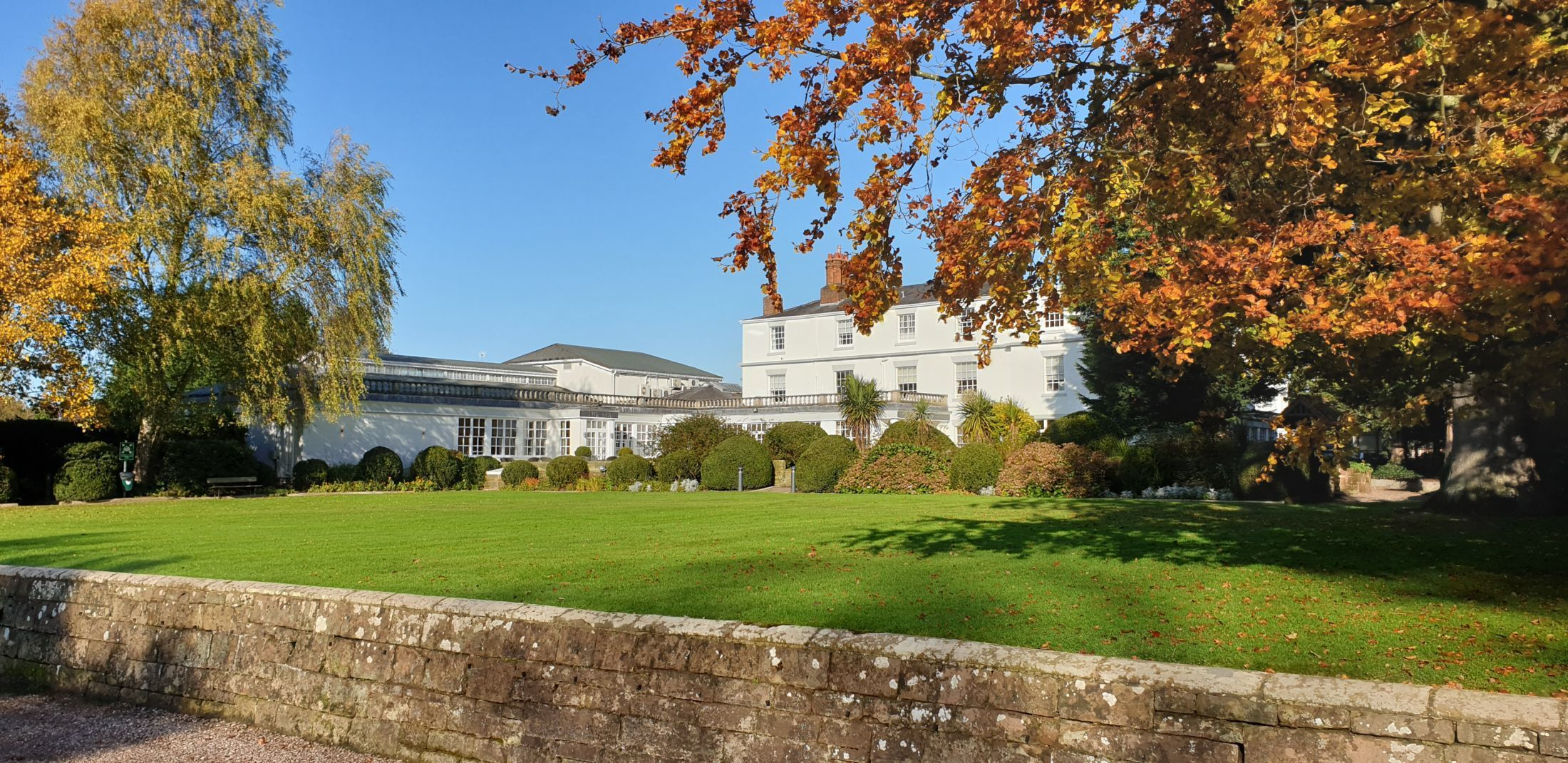
External image of Rowton Hall Hotel in Autumn 2024

Rowton Hall Hotel is a historic stately home, now run as a hotel in Rowton, Cheshire, England. The hall was originally built in the 14th century and was rebuilt in 1779 in the Georgian style. The Battle of Rowton Heath took place in the grounds in 1643. It contains the oak-panelled Thyme Restaurant.

== Early residents ==
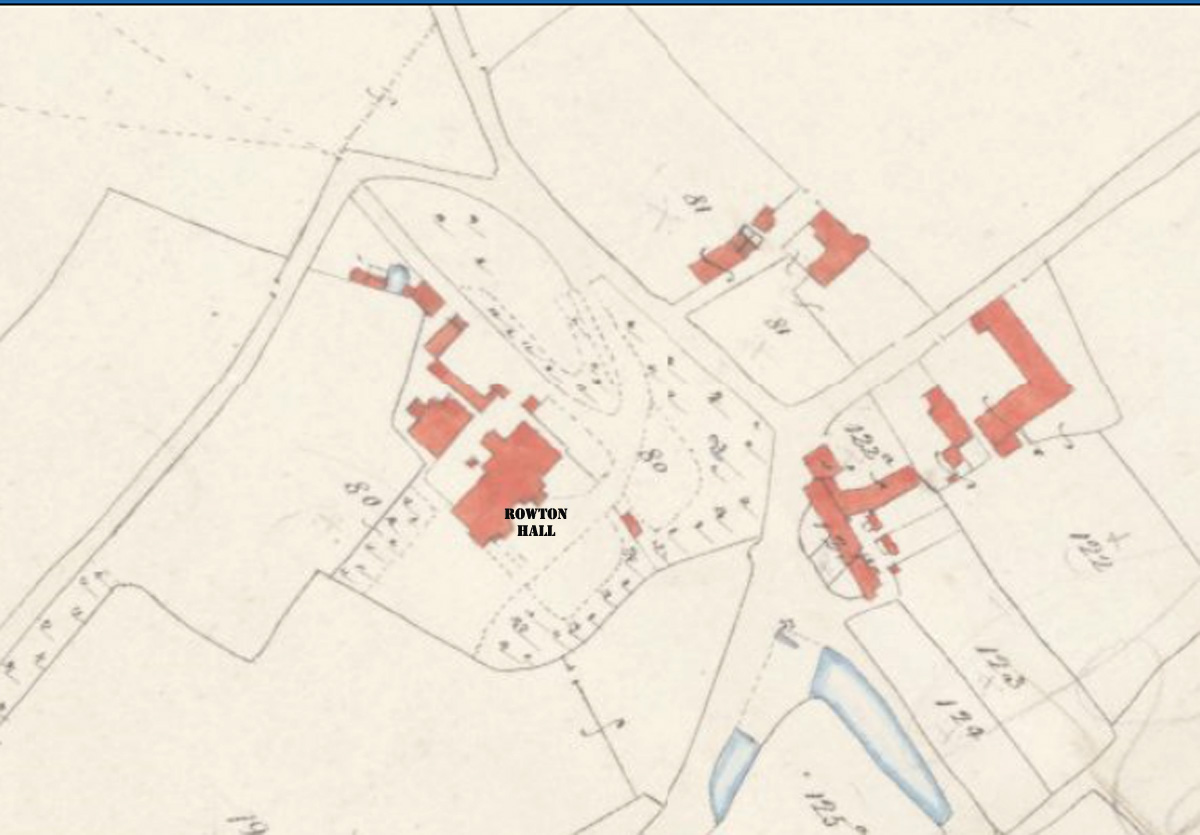
Map of Rowton Hall in 1847 when it was owned by the Tomkinson sisters

Ralph Hignett (1717-1787) built Rowton Hall in 1779. The Hignett family had owned the Rowton estate since 1600 and one member of this family, William Hignett had been killed in the Battle of Rowton Heath in 1645 when he was fighting for Charles I of England.

Ralph built the Hall in 1779 as a residence for himself. He had not married but was interested in community affairs assisting with the building of the Charity School in Christleton. As he had no heirs when he died in 1787 he left Rowton Hall to his brother John Hignett for the term of his life and then after that to his nephew John Litherland on the condition that he change his name to Hignett. John died in 1819 and he left the property to his nephew William Hignett.

William Hignett (1788-1837) was born in 1788 in Liverpool. He married twice and from the time he inherited Rowton Hall he lived there with his family. In 1835 he advertised the property for sale. The advertisement can be seen here. Soon after this it was bought by the Tomkinson sisters.

Anna Maria Tomkinson (1771-1850) and Frances Beatrix Tomkinson (1774-1850) were the daughters of Henry Tomkinson of Dorfold Hall in Nantwich. They were born at Dorfold Hall and spent most of their lives there. When their father Henry died in 1822 they both inherited large amounts of money. They were generous contributors to charitable causes in Christleton and were interested in developing the garden at Rowton Hall. The 1841 Census shows them living there with twelve servants. They both died in 1850 within a few months of each other and they left the Hall to their younger brother William Tomkinson (1790-1872). He did not live there but instead rented it to various tenants including William Ferguson Currie (1828-1866). In 1871 the property was advertised for sale. The advertisement is shown below.

== Residents after 1870 ==
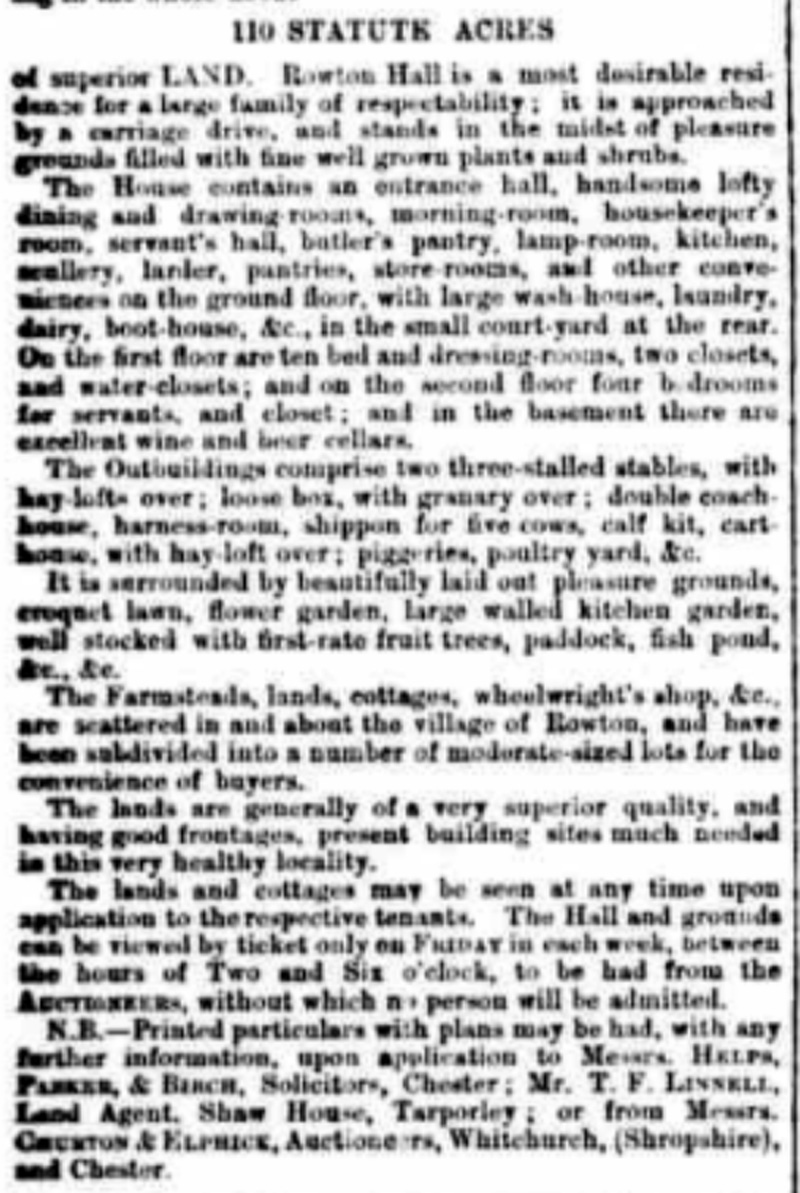
Sale notice for Rowton Hall 1871.

The next resident was Colonel Algernon Robert Garrett (1824-1903) who lived there with his wife Elizabeth Harriet King until about 1889. He was the son of General Sir Robert Garrett. After him the Macfie family became the owners and they remained there for over thirty years.

John William Macfie (1844-1924) was a member of a family who owned a very large well established sugar refining firm called Macfie and Sons. He was the manager of the Liverpool branch of the company. He was born in 1844 in Liverpool and in 1867 he married Helen Wahab, daughter of Major General Charles Wahab. The couple had ten children one of whom, Robert Andrew Scott Macfie, became famous as an author, and another, Scott Macfie, achieved a measure of notability as an entomologist. When John William Macfie's father died in 1893 he inherited Dreghorn Castle in Scotland but he did not live there instead preferring to remain at Rowton Hall. John died in 1924 and the Hall was sold to James Ryder Heap.

James Ryder Heap (1865-1954) was born in 1865 in Liverpool. He worked in his family company of Joseph Heap and Sons rice merchants and then established his own firm called James R Heap and Co in Rangoon. The two firms eventually amalgamated and he became one of the Managing Directors. In 1903 he married Margaret Joyce Holmes, daughter of the Rev Henry Comber Holmes. The couple had two children, a son who died young and a daughter. When James died in 1954 the Hall was sold and it became a hotel.
