= Philip Stanhope (Royalist officer) =

Philip Stanhope was Colonel of the Shelford Manor Royalist forces in the English Civil War. He was the 10th son of Philip Stanhope, 1st Earl of Chesterfield (1584-1656) and his wife Catherine, daughter of Francis Hastings, Baron Hastings.

Part of a network protecting the key Royalist position of Newark on Trent, Shelford was stormed on 3 November 1645 by Parliamentarian forces under John Hutchinson and Sydenham Poyntz. Catholic or Irish troops captured by Parliament were liable to summary execution, and the war was being fought with increasing bitterness, including the alleged death of 700 civilians when Royalist troops took Leicester in May. The garrison of 160 included a number of Catholics, and the majority were killed when the house was stormed, including Stanhope.

== Sources ==
- Appleby, David (2020). "Fleshing out a massacre: the storming of Shelford House and social forgetting in Restoration England" (PDF). Historical Research. 93 (260): 286–308. doi:10.1093/hisres/htaa011.
