= Listed buildings in Rowton, Cheshire =

Rowton is a civil parish in Cheshire West and Chester, England. It contains four buildings that are recorded in the National Heritage List for England as designated listed buildings, all of which are listed at Grade II. This grade is the lowest of the three gradings given to listed buildings and is applied to "buildings of national importance and special interest". Apart from the village of Rowton, the parish is rural. The listed buildings consist of two farmhouses, farmbuildings, and a semi-derelict building that has a traditional association with the Civil War.

Name and location	Photograph	Date	Notes
Rowton Lane Farmhouse; 53.1729°N 2.8277°W	—	Early 17th century	The farmhouse was originally timber framed on a stone plinth, and was encased in brick and extended in the early 18th century. It has a Welsh slate roof, is in two storeys, and has a five-bay front. The windows are casements. The farmhouse has a baffle entry, and an inglenook with a bressumer.
Semi-derelict building 53.17459°N 2.82510°W	—	Early 17th century (probable)	The building is in sandstone, with a brick wall that was added later. It has a thatched roof covered in corrugated iron. The building is in a single storey and has a one-bay front. There is a small square window. A local tradition is that the building acted as a hospital to treat those wounded at the Battle of Rowton Heath in the Civil War in 1645.
Farm buildings, Rowton Lane Farm; 53.1729°N 2.8274°W	—	Early 18th century	The farm buildings are in brick with Welsh slate roofs. They are in two ranges forming an L-shaped plan. The south range is in two storeys with five bays, and contains doorways and circular pitch holes. The west range has arcades of arches on both fronts. Both ranges have ventilation hopes in various patterns.
1 Claypits Lane; 53.1718°N 2.8288°W	—	Early 18th century	A farmhouse that was remodelled in the later 18th century. It is built in brick with stone dressings and a Welsh slate roof. The farmhouse has a rectangular plan, is in three storeys, and has a three-bay front. The windows are sashes, and above the doorway is a triangular pediment.
