= Siege of Chester =

Siege during the First English Civil War

Coordinates: 53.19°N 2.89°W

- Part of the First English Civil War
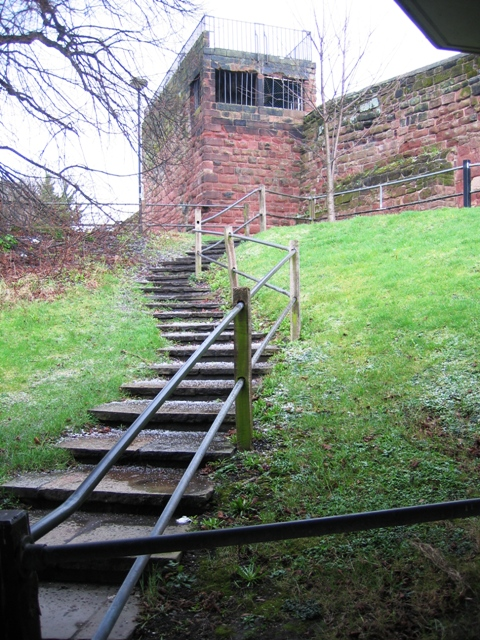
- Morgan's Mount, a Royalist gun platform which was part of Chester's defences in 1645
Date	First siege 20 September 1644–March 1645; Second siege 20 September 1645–3 February 1646
Location	Chester, Cheshire
Result	Parliamentary victory

Belligerents
Royalists	Parliamentarians

Commanders and leaders
Lord Byron	Sir William Brereton; Colonel Michael Jones

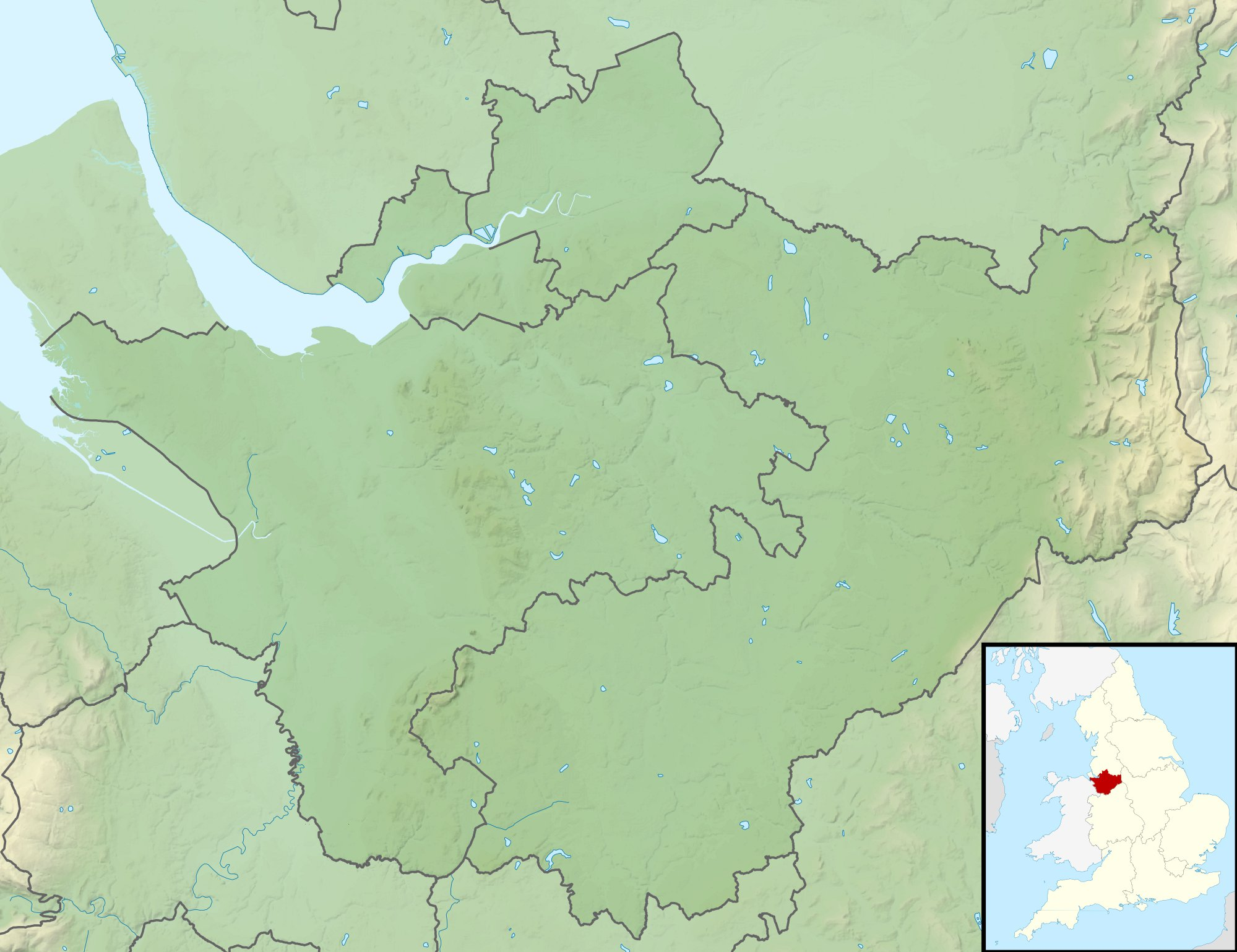
Cheshire

The siege of Chester occurred over a 16-month period between September 1644 and February 1646 during the First English Civil War. In the engagement, Sir William Brereton and the Parliamentarians were ultimately successful in taking possession of the city and Royalist garrison commanded by Lord Byron.

Although the siege spanned nearly one and a half years, the degree to which the city was confined varied in intensity. Throughout the 16-month time period, conflicts continued to occur between the Royalists and the Parliamentarians in Cheshire and during the spring and summer of 1645, the Royalists were successful in causing the Parliamentarians to temporarily lift the siege. Ultimately, however, the Parliamentarians enforced a total blockade and captured the city.

== Background ==
At the outset of the English Civil War, Chester was held by forces loyal to King Charles. The city was especially important to the Royalists as its location on the River Dee and proximity to the Irish Sea made it an important gateway to both Ireland and North Wales. The central city was surrounded partially by the river and protected by strong city walls dating back to the times of the Romans. When the civil war broke out, the Royalists further strengthened the city walls and added a ring of earthwork defences extending out and around portions of the city to the north and east.

In March 1643, Sir William Brereton was put in command of the Parliamentarian forces in Cheshire, an area where most of the gentry supported King Charles. Over the next year, Brereton took control over most of Cheshire. Chester, however, remained a Royalist strongpoint under the command of Lord Byron.

== September 1644 to March 1645 ==
On 20 September 1644, Brereton advanced upon Chester and took possession of portions of the city's outworks. After Lord Byron rejected Brereton's summons for the city to surrender, a loose or partial siege of the city began. During this time, Brereton did what he could to stop the flow of provisions and munitions into the city, however, his force was not large enough to put a total blockade into effect. As a result, warfare continued outside the city as Royalists sallied out to attack Brereton's garrisons in Cheshire. In late October, Brereton responded by attempting to mount a concerted attack on the fortifications and overtake the city. When the attack failed, Brereton ended the assaults but continued the loose siege of the city.

The siege of Chester continued through the autumn and into the winter of 1645 until Brereton raised the siege on 19 February when Prince Maurice approached. The respite, however, lasted only for approximately 30 days as in mid-March Prince Rupert departed taking 1,200 seasoned troopers with him. This left Byron and Chester with only six hundred regular soldiers along with the citizens who took to arms to defend their city. Immediately thereafter, Brereton re-surrounded Chester and resumed the loose siege. Once again, however, the siege was interrupted approximately three weeks later when Brereton was ordered to withdraw his forces back to the River Mersey because of the reported approach of a Royalist army. This would then be the end of the Chester siege for many months over the spring and summer as in June Parliament scaled back their operations in Cheshire.

== Summer of 1645 ==
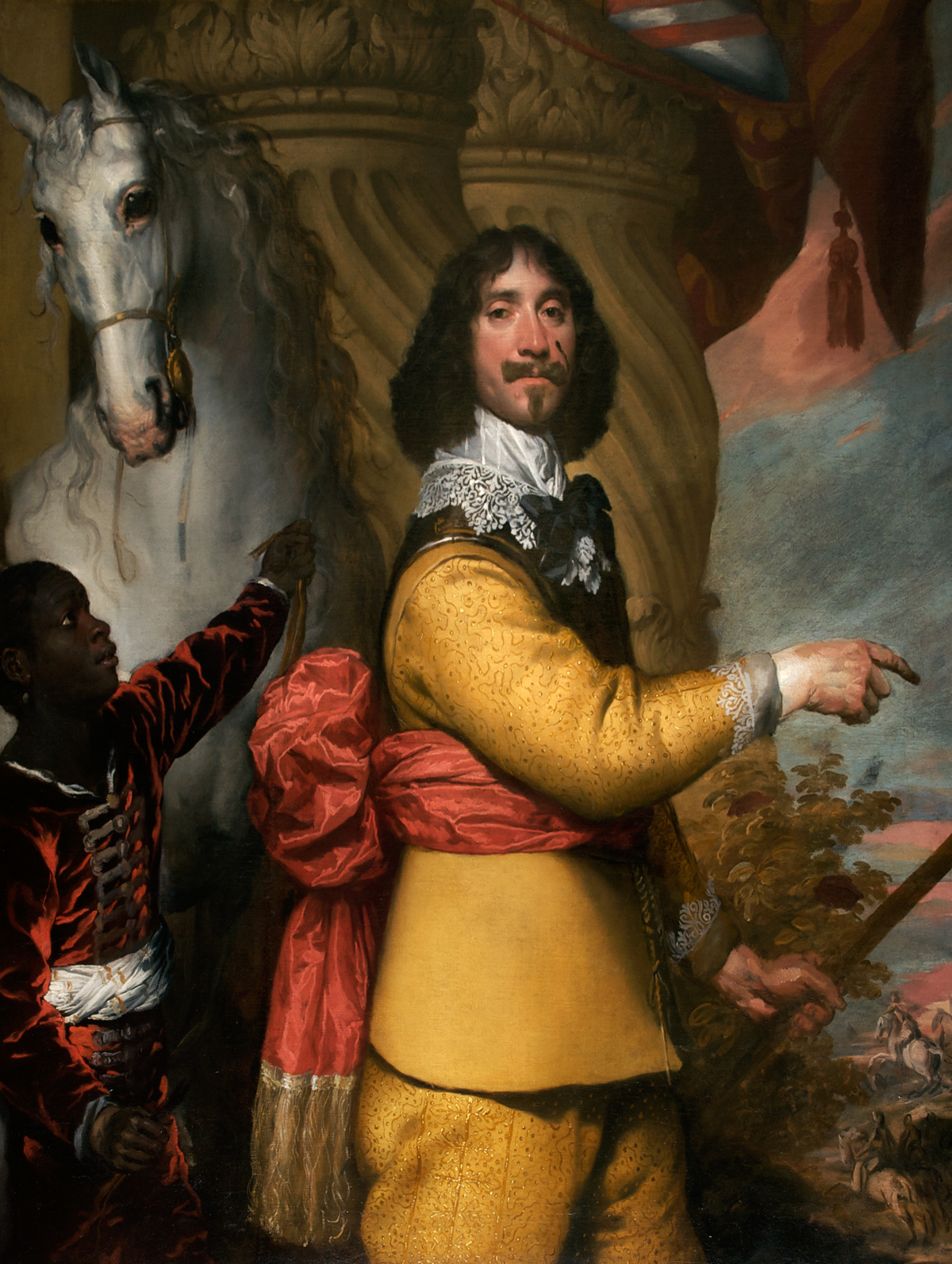
Portrait of Lord Byron by William Dobson, 1643. Lord Byron, garrison commander

On 14 June 1645, Charles's main army was decisively beaten at the Battle of Naseby by the New Model Army under Sir Thomas Fairfax. The King then withdrew to Hereford, hoping for more reinforcements from Wales and Ireland. Early in July 1645, he lodged at Raglan Castle in Wales. On 10 July his army in the west of England under Lord Goring was heavily defeated at the Battle of Langport, and news also reached Charles that an army of Covenanters was marching south from Scotland. At the beginning of August 1645, Charles left Raglan with some 2,500 men, marching northwards along the Welsh border in the hope of rallying more Royalists to his cause in the north of England. He reached Doncaster on 18 August, where he had news that both the Parliamentary Northern Association army and a force of Covenanter cavalry were moving towards him. He quickly withdrew to Newark and then to Oxford, by way of a punitive attack on Huntingdon, Oliver Cromwell's home town and Parliamentary base.

On 30 August the King marched to the assistance of his forces at Hereford, by now under siege by Lord Leven's Covenanters, but as the royal army approached news reached Leven of Montrose's victory on 15 August at the Battle of Kilsyth. He abandoned the siege of Hereford, marching north, so that Charles was able to occupy the town on 4 September. The King returned to Raglan, where some two weeks later he received news that Prince Rupert had surrendered Bristol.

== September 1645 to February 1646 ==
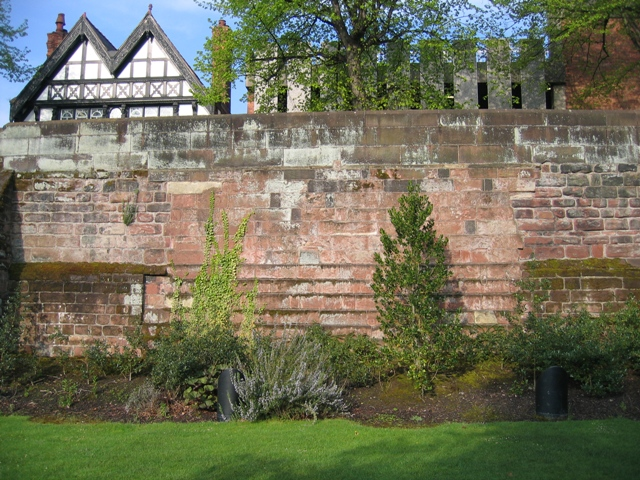
Paler sandstone fills a breach in the Chester city walls made in September 1645

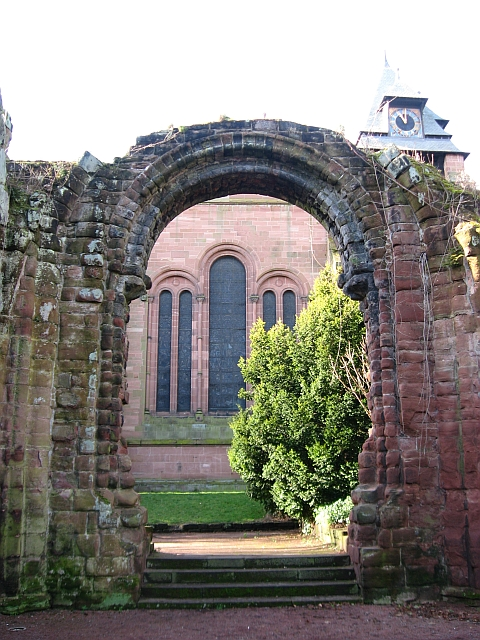
St John the Baptist's Church was badly damaged during the siege

With his remaining forces, Charles marched north from Raglan, hoping to join Montrose, not knowing that on 13 September Montrose had suffered a catastrophic defeat at the Battle of Philiphaugh. The Committee of Both Kingdoms at that time instructed Sydnam Poyntz to pursue and contain the King. Following his orders, Poyntz set out with a mounted force of some 3,000 cavalry and dragoons. The King continued to advance to the north and on 22 September he reached Chirk Castle where he received news of a Parliamentarian attack on Chester.

Early on 20 September 1645, just before daylight, a New Model Army force of more than 700 infantry and an equal number of cavalry, led by Colonel Michael Jones, began a fresh assault on Chester. The attack broke through the outer Royalist earthworks in the eastern suburbs. After Jones had ordered the burning of the urban areas in front of the east gate, he moved artillery up to St John the Baptist's Church to bombard the city wall. By 22 September when the King arrived at Chirk, Jones' guns had already created a breach in Chester's walls.

After receiving the news of the attack, King Charles set out for Chester with all possible speed. The King reached Chester on 23 September with an advance party consisting of his lifeguards, Gerard's brigade of some 600 horse, and a small number of foot soldiers. This force was able to enter the city from the western bank of the River Dee as it was still under Royalist control. Meanwhile, in the hope of trapping the besieging forces between the King's main army and an enlarged garrison within the city, Sir Marmaduke Langdale took approximately 3,000 troopers from the King's cavalry north towards Chester by means of Holt at dawn on 24 September.

Moving north-east, Langdale received reports near the village of Rowton that Poyntz's Parliamentarian cavalry was approaching Chester from Whitchurch, Shropshire. Poyntz, who had ridden through the night to intercept the Royalist army, came upon Langdale and the Royalist cavalry at Rowton Moor. The two opposing forces battled for several hours with neither gaining an advantage until 2:00 pm when Parliamentarian reinforcements arrived from Chester. King Charles is said to have watched the ensuing defeat of his forces at the Battle of Rowton Heath from the Phoenix Tower on Chester's city walls. After the arrival of the Parliamentarian reinforcements, the Royalist cavalry was routed. Among the Royalist killed in the battle were King Charles' cousin Lord Bernard Stewart.

King Charles remained in Chester overnight, but on 25 September, he broke away with a force of 500 mounted troopers and rode to Denbigh in North Wales. Byron remained behind with the Royalist garrison at Chester. That same morning, the Parliamentarians re-encircled the town and re-initiated the bombardment. By the next day, the bombardment had created a breach in the city wall at Newgate. The Parliamentarians continued the bombardment and then on 8 October they attempted to enter the city by attacking. The Parliamentarians failed in their attack and ended their assaults deciding to tighten the blockage and continue the siege.

The siege then continued for three months during which the Royalists would not surrender nor consider terms. During this time many inhabitants died of starvation. In January 1646, William Ince, the Mayor of Chester, persuaded Byron to consider terms. Negotiations began on 20 January and were concluded on 1 February. On 3 February, Brereton and the Parliamentarians occupied Chester.

== Aftermath ==
The city of Chester suffered a great deal during the siege. In addition to the loss of life that occurred, many buildings, including dwellings, mansions, barns, work-houses, dairy-houses, halls, and chapels, were destroyed. Many churches were severely damaged. City funds were exhausted.

== Gallery ==
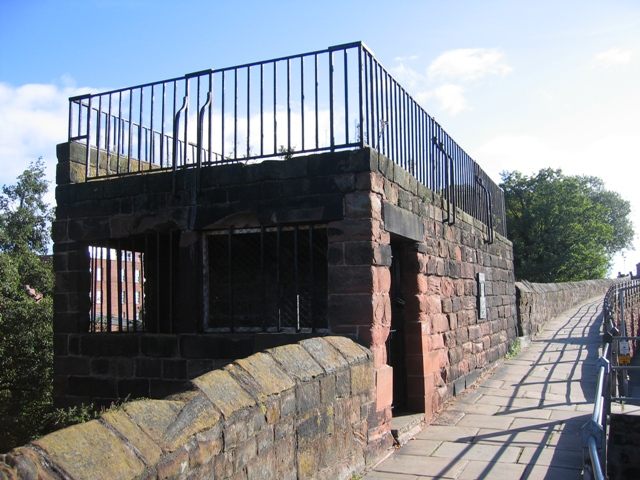
During the siege, the Royalist Captain Morgan placed guns on this watch tower, now called Morgan's Mount. Skeletons were found here beneath the walls when the Chester Canal was dug a century later.

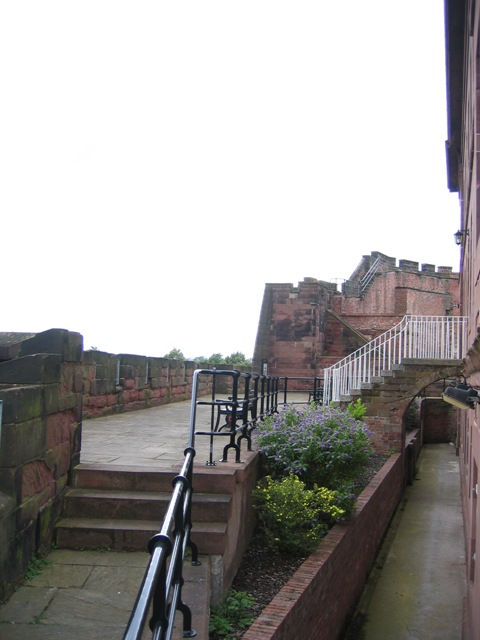
The battlements of Chester Castle were used by the Royalist garrison for artillery platforms.

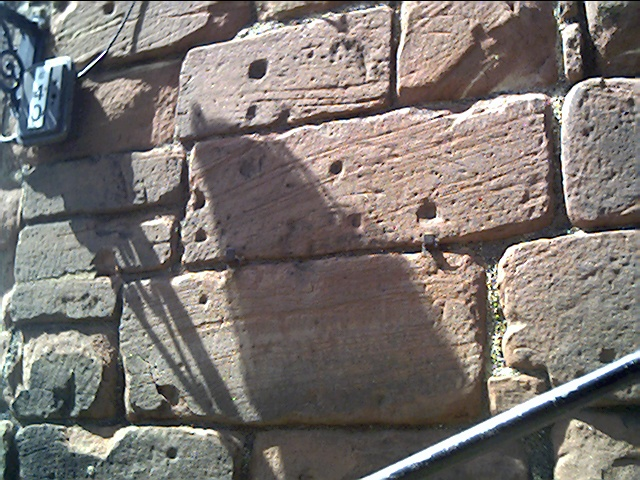
Civil war musket ball damage still visible on Bonewaldesthorne's Tower

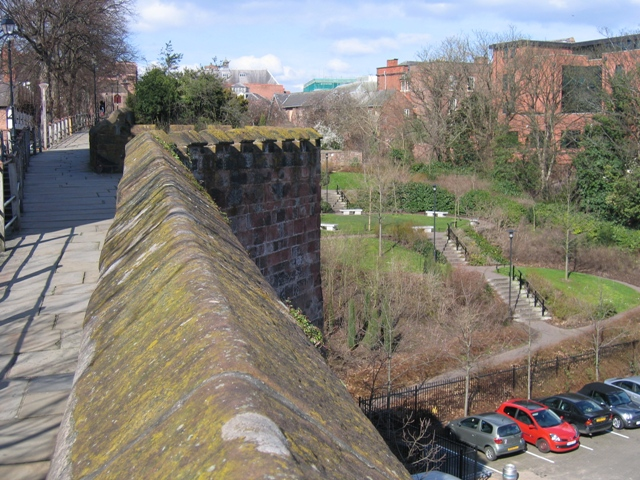
Damage by civil war cannonballs are still visible on Barnaby's Tower.

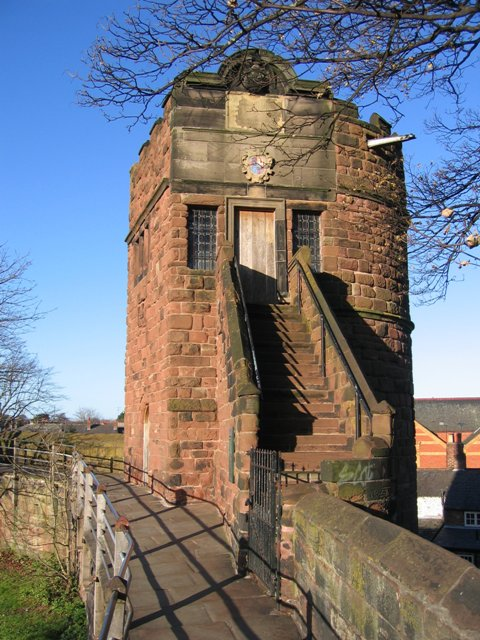
The Phoenix Tower, from which King Charles is said to have watched the defeat of his forces at the Battle of Rowton Heath.

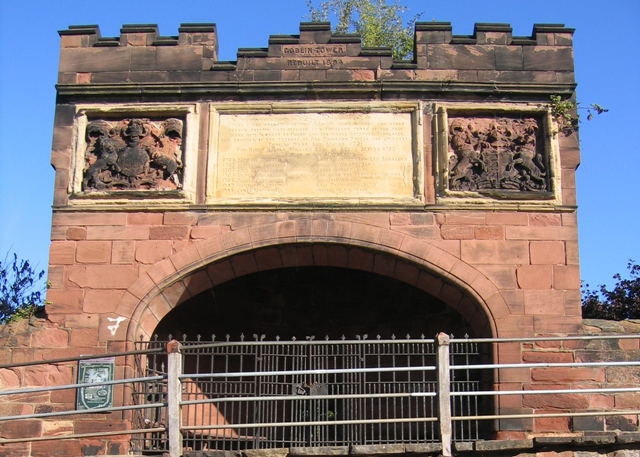
An 18th-century plaque on the Goblin Tower, marking the repairs to the city walls following heavy damage during the civil war.

== See also ==
- Siege of Bristol (1645)
- Siege of Colchester
- Siege of Pembroke
