= Storming of Shelford House =

Confrontation of the English Civil War between 1 and 3 November 1645

- Part of the English Civil War
Date	1–3 November 1645
Location	Shelford House, Newark 52.9841°N 1.0000°W
Result	Parliamentarian victory: Shelford House destroyed

Belligerents
Royalists	Parliamentarians

Commanders and leaders
Philip Stanhope (DOW); Lawrence Clifton †	Sydnam Poyntz; John Hutchinson; Edward Rossiter

Strength
150 cavalry 50 infantry	4,000 cavalry 5,000 infantry

Casualties and losses
160 men killed ~ 40 men captured	60 men killed
- Location within Nottinghamshire

The Storming of Shelford House was a confrontation of the English Civil War that took place from 1 to 3 November 1645. The Parliamentarian force of Colonel-General Sydnam Poyntz attacked the Royalist outpost of Shelford House, which was one of a group of strongholds defending the strategically important town of Newark-on-Trent. The house, owned by Philip Stanhope, 1st Earl of Chesterfield and controlled by his son Philip Stanhope, and made up of mostly Catholic soldiers, was overwhelmed by the Parliamentarian force after calls for submission were turned down by Stanhope. The majority of the defenders were killed in the resulting sack by the Parliamentarians, commanded by Colonel John Hutchinson, and the house was then burned to the ground. Stanhope died soon afterwards from injuries he sustained in the attack.

Poyntz used his momentum from Shelford to then take Wiverton Hall, another of the Newark strongholds, the following day and also began to invest Belvoir Castle. By the end of the month he had joined with the Scottish army of General Alexander Leslie, 1st Earl of Leven and besieged Newark, which surrendered on 8 May of the following year. With the Royalist garrison having lost 80 per cent of its men killed, mostly the Catholics, the storming of Shelford House was a highly violent affair; because of this the Parliamentarians declined to use it for propaganda. Equally, the Royalists failed to publicise the actions of Poyntz's army because they did not wish to show support for the Catholics who had died. The battle has been compared in scale to similar events at Bolton in 1644 and Leicester in 1645.

== Background ==
Shelford House was originally a priory, and had been owned by the Stanhope family since the dissolution of the monasteries in 1536. The original priory was then extended into a substantial mansion surrounded by a moat in around 1600. At the time of the start of the English Civil War in 1642 the estate was owned by Philip Stanhope, 1st Earl of Chesterfield, who supported the Royalist cause. Chesterfield's main seat in Derbyshire was quickly taken by Parliamentarian forces, and so he used Shelford as headquarters for a troop of cavalry with which he led patrols into the Vale of Belvoir. Shelford was situated in Nottinghamshire, 9 miles (14 km) east of the town of Newark-on-Trent. Newark's location at the crossroads between the Fosse Way and Great North Road meant it was known as the "Key to the North", and this strategically important location was quickly secured by the Royalists in December 1642 when Sir John Henderson was sent to fortify the town. As part of his plans for fortifications Henderson set up a series of mutually supportive defensive locations that would act as a buffer between Newark and Parliamentarian attacks.

Shelford House was chosen as one of these strongholds, along with Belvoir Castle, Wiverton Hall, and Thurgarton House. The four stately homes now made up the first line of Royalist defence against attacks from the Parliamentarian towns of Nottingham, Derby, and Leicester. Shelford and Wiverton were the largest of the four, but none of them was expected to hold out against a concerted assault; at best the expectation was that they would delay an attack on Newark. In January 1643 Chesterfield left Shelford to take command of a garrison force at Lichfield, and gave command of the house to his son Philip Stanhope. He was the lieutenant-colonel in command of the Duke of Gloucester's Regiment of Horse situated at Shelford, and as governor he then also gained control of the small number of infantrymen stationed there as part of the garrison. The house was used as a forward observation post and also served as the staging point for raids from Newark into Nottingham, which succeeded in causing much damage to Parliamentarian outposts and the countryside.

Now an official Royalist garrison, Shelford received several upgrades to increase its defences. Outside the walls of the house, the moat (probably originally part of the house's medieval drainage system) was improved and deepened and a palisade was built around the inner edge of it, while sharpened poles and spikes were placed at the base of the ramparts and in the moat itself to slow attackers. Behind the ramparts a series of half-moon earthworks were built with a ditch in front of each, for use by defenders if the ramparts were taken by an enemy force. The mansion itself was behind these earthworks and would be held by musketeers who could cover the defenders outside. These heavy fortifications meant that while the governor of Nottingham, Colonel John Hutchinson, was aware of the role Shelford played as a staging post for Royalist attacks on his town, he made no attempt to attack it for the first two years of the Civil War.

On 24 September 1645 the Parliamentarian army of Colonel-General Sydnam Poyntz defeated a Royalist army at the Battle of Rowton Heath. Having already been defeated at the Battle of Naseby in June, King Charles retreated to Newark in October with 2,400 cavalry, which he then billeted in the surrounding area. Shelford House was given the Queen's Regiment of Horse, a regiment originally made up of French and Walloon Catholics that had escorted the Queen to England in February 1643. By the time of its arrival at Shelford, the regiment had been severely depleted through action, having gained an ugly reputation for vicious crimes and attacks during events such as the Battle of Burton Bridge in 1643 and the sack of Leicester in 1645. Combined with their foreign Catholicism, the regiment was well known and heavily disliked by the Parliamentarians, who often used their actions in propaganda. Having been reinforced by Catholics from Lancashire, the regiment was 150 men strong and commanded by Major Lawrence Clifton when it arrived at Shelford, making the total garrison approximately 200 strong as Poyntz carefully advanced towards Newark.

== Siege ==
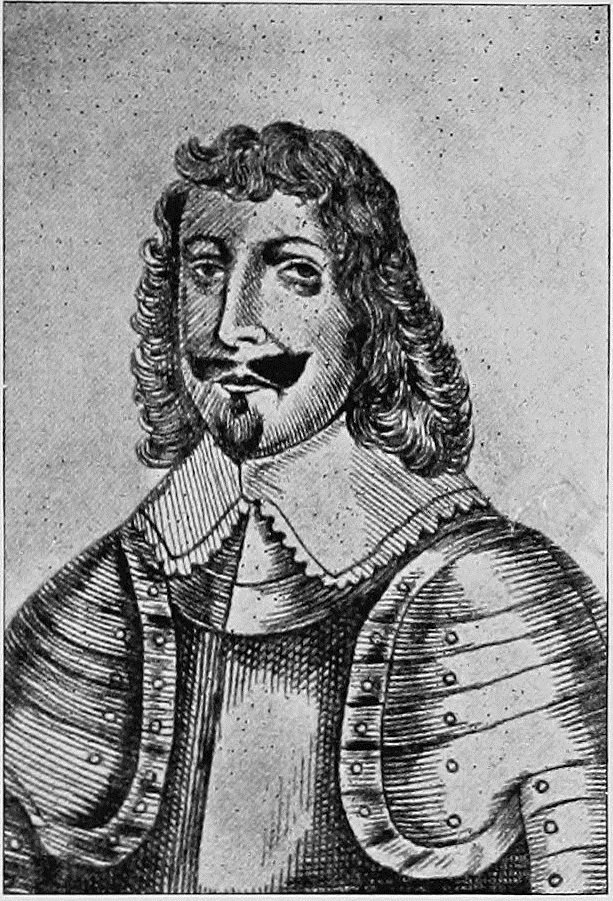
Colonel-General Sydnam Poyntz

Wary of the Royalist forces now congregated around Newark, Poyntz's force of 3,000 cavalry and 500 infantry was reinforced by a brigade of 1,000 cavalry from London and the regional Parliamentarian commanders in the area supplied him with a further 4,500 infantrymen. (Note: Many of these locally supplied soldiers arrived after the siege had started on 1 November. They came from the following locations: 100 from Bedford, 500 from Derby, 200 from Cambridge, 100 from Rutland, 1,500 from Lincolnshire, 500 from King's Lynn, 200 from Newport Pagnell, 100 from Huntingdon, 500 from Nottingham, 300 from the Isle of Ely, and 500 from Leicester.) As part of this Hutchinson provided a group of 400 men from his town to join Poyntz, but the force was still not of a size to compete with the main Royalist formations. Ordered to get closer to Charles to ensure he could not escape before larger Parliamentarian armies reached Newark and in need of action to fend off a possible mutiny from his underpaid and underfed soldiers, Poyntz went on the offensive. Shelford House, with its large garrison of cavalry, would be a dangerous thorn in an army's side if left alone to attack the supply lines of the advancing Parliamentarians, and so Hutchinson urged Poyntz to choose it as his first target. After waiting to receive some more reinforcements from Lincolnshire under Colonel Edward Rossiter, the Parliamentarians arrived at Shelford on 1 November with an initial force of 2,000 of their men.

Hutchinson, who accompanied the force, was a cousin of Stanhope's, and he received permission to attempt to talk him into submission. Despite their connection, Stanhope replied to Hutchinson's mission in a scornful manner, mocking Hutchinson and declaring that he would "lay Nottingham Castle as flatt [sic] as a pancake". Stanhope had himself commanded a particularly brutal raid on a fort guarding the bridges to Nottingham over the River Trent in April, and his callous response to the request for a peaceful surrender caused great resentment among the Parliamentarians who were urged to look for revenge for Stanhope's previous attack. This combined with a hatred for the Catholic troops that were known to be part of Shelford's garrison, because of their notoriously violent conduct in and after battle. With this high level of tension throughout the Parliamentarian force, Poyntz began the initial stages of his assault on the house.

=== Attack ===
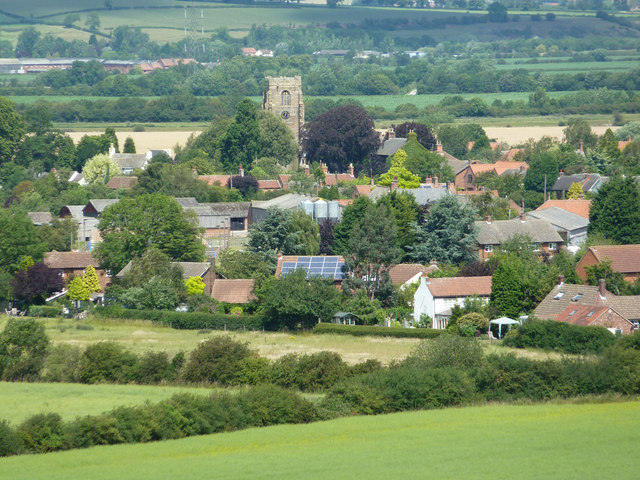
View of Shelford village, showing the church tower garrisoned by some of Stanhope's men

Poyntz first sent Hutchinson to capture the nearby village of Shelford, where Stanhope had a group of men garrisoning the church tower. The men had drawn the ladder in the tower up but were eventually smoked out by a fire set beneath them and captured; one boy was recognised as a turncoat from Nottingham's garrison. In fear for his life, the boy revealed all he knew about Shelford House's improved defences and disclosed where the palisades were weakest, which had previously been only vaguely known to the Parliamentarians. (Note: The boy avoided being hanged by revealing this information, and provided such good service to Hutchinson during the assault that he afterwards took him on as a footboy.) With this knowledge now available, Poyntz made a final formal offer for Stanhope to surrender on 3 November. Poyntz emphasised that if his offer was refused, his men would be allowed free rein in the attack per the rules of war at the time that agreed that a garrison that refused to surrender peacefully gave up its right to be protected after the assault was complete. Despite receiving this warning, Stanhope declined the offer, saying:

"Sir, I keepe this garrison for the King, and in defence of it I will live and die, and your number is not so great, nor you so much master of the field, but that I am confident soon to lessen your number and see you abroad; and for relief, we need none. Therefore I desire you to be satisfied with this answer from Your Servant, Phil. Stanhope."

Fearing any further delay at Shelford would allow the Newark and Belvoir garrisons to come to the house's aid, Poyntz launched his assault at 4 p.m. on the same day, with Hutchinson given direct command of the attacking party. The attack took the form of two prongs, with one assaulting the east ramparts and the other the west ramparts. The men threw faggots of wood into the moat so that they could climb over it, and then raised their scaling ladders against Shelford's walls. However, the ladders were found to be too short and the defending Royalists were able to throw logs down on the climbing Parliamentarians, making the climb up almost impossible. A force of Londoners that had been tasked with attacking the west ramparts were beaten back from their attack first, which allowed Stanhope to send more troops to defend the east. The defence of the east ramparts was stout, with the Parliamentarian Colonel Richard Sandys later conceding that they were "defended galiantly [sic]", but after half an hour of bitter close quarters fighting, the attackers, under Hutchinson, succeeded in taking the east ramparts from their defenders, taking heavy casualties in doing so.

Hutchinson led his Nottingham men over the taken position and into the ground below, only to find that the Queen's Regiment, fighting dismounted, had retreated into their half-moon earthworks. The Parliamentarians took the house's stable block but were attacked by musket fire from Shelford House and from more reinforcements sent from the west ramparts. Hutchinson was trapped inside Shelford's walls; Sandys and Hutchinson's brother George, also a colonel, made a concerted effort to force the house's gates open to relieve him. Finally a group of dismounted cavalry under the command of Major Christopher Ennis succeeded in breaking into Shelford's gatehouse, opening the drawbridge over the moat and allowing Poyntz to reinforce Hutchinson's beleaguered men inside.

While it was already expected that no quarter would be given to Stanhope and his men, Poyntz now faced the added possibility of a Royalist relief force arriving while his soldiers were still fighting inside Shelford House, which would leave them cornered. (Note: No relief party ever reached Shelford; one did begin the march from Newark but turned around soon afterwards.) He whipped his men into a frenzy and coerced them into fighting more savagely, which quickly and violently ended the resistance of the defenders of the house and earthworks.

== Aftermath ==
Around 160 of the defenders, or 80 per cent of Stanhope's original force, were killed in the ensuing attack before Poyntz halted his men; most of the dead were from the Queen's Regiment who had received little mercy. The Parliamentarians had lost around 60 men killed. They buried their casualties at Shelford by rolling them into large mass graves and then sent the wounded back to Nottingham to be tended to. Chesterfield claimed in 1647 that during the attack the Parliamentarians had killed a number of children, slashed women with knives and mutilated the dead afterwards. Stanhope himself had survived the battle but had been badly wounded towards the end of it. Unable to move, he was looted by Parliamentarian troops and possibly then thrown on a dung heap. He was discovered in this state by Sandys or George Hutchinson, and was taken to his bedroom in the house. (Note: Sandys claimed he was the one to discover Stanhope, while John Hutchinson's wife Lucy recorded that it was his brother who found him.) Here the Hutchinson brothers stayed with their cousin until he died of his wounds, despite the efforts of a surgeon. Clifton of the Queen's Regiment was also among the dead. The surviving 40 or so Royalists were taken as prisoners of war and in the night the house was burned down after being comprehensively looted. (Note: Part of the manor house survived the fire and was rebuilt in 1676, and that house is the present Shelford Manor. The house's grounds still hold traces of both medieval and English Civil War earthworks.) The Parliamentarians completed the destruction by pulling down the charred remains with grappling hooks and ropes.

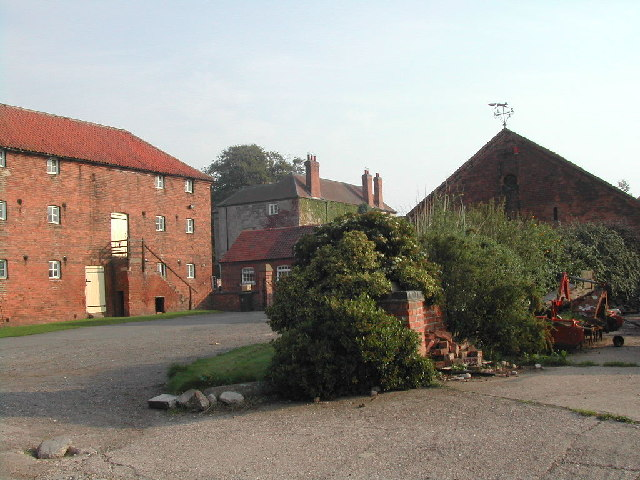
Modern day Shelford Manor

Poyntz had succeeded in destroying the Shelford garrison and was now able to advance on other Royalist positions, but his goal of cornering Charles and stopping his escape failed, as Charles fled on 3 November to Oxford. Despite this Poyntz continued his campaign and advanced on Wiverton Hall; the governor, Sir Robert Thervill, having seen the slaughter of his allies and wanting to avoid the same fate, surrendered a day after Shelford and was allowed by Poyntz to leave the area unmolested. However, the Shelford garrison's destruction did not affect all of the strongpoints in the same way, and Belvoir Castle refused to surrender. Its governor, Sir Gervase Lucas, finally surrendered in January 1646 after the garrison had been almost starved to death. Being much more diplomatic in his dealings with Poyntz than Stanhope had been, and having a force made up mostly of Protestants, Lucas was received kindly by Poyntz and was not attacked. In the meantime, a Scottish army under the command of General Alexander Leslie, 1st Earl of Leven had arrived to bolster the Parliamentarian forces around Newark on 22 November; the town was besieged on 26 November and surrendered on 6 May 1646, a day after Charles himself surrendered to Leven's army.

Despite the clear victory at Shelford, Parliamentarian writers did not emphasise it because they wished to avoid drawing comparisons to the Royalist massacres of foreign forces that had also taken place, which would have damaged their image of being morally better than their opponents. Chesterfield had pamphlets made to highlight the barbarous nature of the attack on his house, but these were not very successful and Royalists were uninterested in putting the mostly Catholic garrison in the way of martyrdom. Stanhope, however, was an uncomplicated Protestant who was remembered as a martyr in company with the likes of Spencer Compton, 2nd Earl of Northampton, Sir Charles Lucas, and Sir George Lisle as late as 1650. When the Stuart Restoration occurred in 1660, however, the story of Stanhope and his contemporaries was forgotten in the haste to memorialise the execution of Charles I.

== Significance ==
While the amount of men killed at Shelford House was relatively small compared to other massacres in the Civil War such as at the Siege of Drogheda, the violent nature of the assault was wildly out of proportion with the insignificant nature of the strategic importance of the attack. Despite this, the attack and massacre have been overlooked in most works on the English Civil War in favour of other more notorious events that were publicised by the Royalists or Parliamentarians during the conflict to bolster support for their causes. The nature of the storming of Shelford House was further forgotten after a campaign to erase the history of the Queen's Regiment found success, with it being recorded later on as Lord St Alban's Regiment to disassociate itself with its actions. The attack has been researched more in recent years, with the historian David J. Appleby arguing that it should be held on the same footing of violence as the storming of Bolton in 1644 and Leicester in 1645.
