= Holme Hall =

Holme Hall may refer to:

- Holme Hall, Bakewell, Derbyshire
- Holme Hall, Cliviger, Burnley, Lancashire
- Holme Hall, East Riding of Yorkshire. Holme-on-Spalding-Moor
