= Michael Stanhope (Royalist) =

Michael Stanhope (died 1648) was born at Shelford Manor, the son of Philip Stanhope, 1st Earl of Chesterfield and his wife Catherine, daughter of Lord Hastings. Colonel Stanhope was in charge of the Royalist forces at the 1648 battle at Willoughby Field, Nottinghamshire, where he was killed. After the battle he was buried among his men in Willoughby church. A monument was erected to him and his men.
