= Baron Langdale =

Extinct barony in the Peerage of England

Arms of Langdale of Yorkshire: Sable, a chevron between three estoiles argent. Motto: Foy en Tout ("Faith in all things")

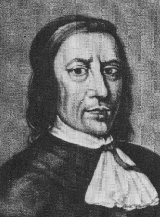
Marmaduke Langdale, 1st Baron Langdale.

Baron Langdale was a title that was created twice in British history. The first creation came in the Peerage of England on 4 February 1658 when the prominent royalist commander of the English Civil War, Sir Marmaduke Langdale, was made by Baron Langdale, of Holme. He had fought alongside Prince Rupert and the Marquess of Newcastle at the Battle of Marston Moor, prior to the war he was the High Sheriff of Yorkshire and in later life a Catholic convert. His son, the second Baron, was Governor of Kingston-upon-Hull. The title descended from father to son until the death of the fifth Baron in 1777. He had no heir as his only son had died as an infant and the title became extinct on his death in 1777. The territorial designation "of Holme" refers to the family's chief seat, Holme Hall in the parish of Holme-on-Spalding-Moor, Yorkshire. The ancient surname of "Langdale" (originally de Langdale) refers to the manor of Langdale in the hundred of Pickering in the County of York which Marmaduke's ancestors held as their seat from before the reign of King John (1199–1216).

The second creation came in the Peerage of the United Kingdom on 23 January 1836 when Henry Bickersteth was made Baron Langdale, of Langdale in the County of Westmorland. He was appointed Master of the Rolls the same year. He had one daughter but no sons and the barony became extinct on his death in 1851. The evangelical clergyman Edward Bickersteth was the younger brother of Lord Langdale.

== Barons Langdale (of Holme); First creation (1658) ==
- Marmaduke Langdale, 1st Baron Langdale of Holme (1658–5 August 1661). he was born at Pighall, the son of Peter Langdale and Anne Wharton. He married Lenox Rhodes on 12 September 1626. They had five 5 children. He died at Holme-on-Spalding-Mooron 5 August 1661, aged 63.
- Marmaduke Langdale, 2nd Baron Langdale of Holme (14 January 1661–25 February 1703). He was born at Holme-on-Spalding-Moor, the son of Marmaduke Langdale, 1st Baron Langdale of Holme and Lenox Rhodes. He married Elizabeth Savage of Beeston. They had six children. He died at Holme-on-Spalding-Moor on 25 February 1703, aged 42.
- Marmaduke Langdale, 3rd Baron Langdale of Holme (1703–12 December 1718). He was the son of Marmaduke Langdale, 2nd Baron Langdale of Holme and Elizabeth Savage. He married Frances Draycott of Painesley. They had three children. He died at Holme-on-Spalding-Moor on 12 December 1718.
- Marmaduke Langdale, 4th Baron Langdale of Holme (1718–8 January 1771). He was the son of Marmaduke Langdale, 3rd Baron Langdale of Holme and Frances Draycott. He married Elizabeth Widdrington on 3 August 1706. They had four children. He died at his house on Golden Square, Soho on 8 January 1771 in his 90th year.
- Marmaduke Langdale, 5th Baron Langdale of Holme (1771–1778). He was the son of Marmaduke Langdale, 4th Baron Langdale of Holme and Elizabeth Widrington. He married Constantia Smythe. They had five children. He died at Jermyn Street, London on 5 April 1778, when the barony became extinct.

== Barons Langdale; Second creation (1836) ==
- Henry Bickersteth, 1st Baron Langdale (1783–1851)
