= Philip Stanhope, 1st Earl of Chesterfield =

English nobleman and aristocrat

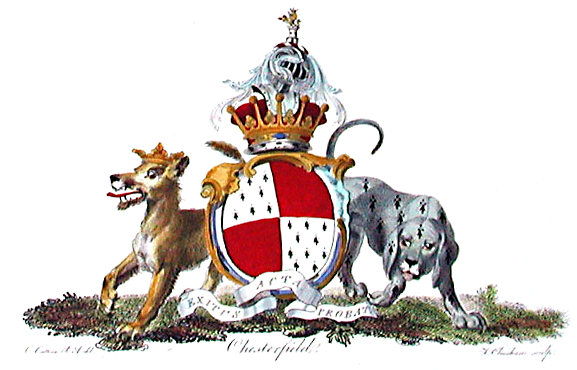
Coat of arms of the Earls of Chesterfield

Philip Stanhope, 1st Earl of Chesterfield (1584 – 12 September 1656) was an English nobleman, aristocrat and royalist, who was created the first Earl of Chesterfield by King Charles I in 1628.

== Biography ==
Stanhope was the only son of Sir John Stanhope of Shelford, Nottinghamshire by his first wife, Cordell Allington, but was raised by his father's second wife, Catherine Trentham (d. 1621).

Stanhope was knighted in 1605 by James I. On 7 November 1616, he was created Baron Stanhope and was further elevated as Earl of Chesterfield on 4 August 1628.

Leading up to the English Civil War, Chesterfield was summoned to Parliament in 1640 and took the side of King Charles I in the threatening conflict. When the conflict broke out he and his sons took up arms. Shelford Manor, his home in Nottinghamshire, was garrisoned under the command of his son Philip. The house was attacked and his son lost his life defending it on 3 November 1645. The Parliamentarian army took the house and burnt it to the ground.

Chesterfield, with an army of some 300 gentlemen and supporters sometime earlier had taken Lichfield for the King. They were attacked by a force led by Sir John Gell and Lord Brooke with 200 men and cannon. Lord Brooke was killed in the encounter on 2 March 1643. Chesterfield's forces were forced to surrender and were made prisoner. Chesterfield himself was imprisoned and held on parole at his house in Covent Garden in lieu of being committed to the Tower of London. He died still in captivity on 12 September 1656, some three and a half years before the Restoration in 1660.

== Family ==
In 1604, Stanhope married Catherine Hastings (d. 1636), daughter of Francis Hastings, Lord Hastings. According to Sir Egerton Brydges pp. 23, Catherine and Philip had eleven sons and two daughters:

- John (bur. 27 July 1623)
- Henry Stanhope, Lord Stanhope (died 29 November 1634), the husband of Katherine Wotton, together the parents of Philip Stanhope, 2nd Earl of Chesterfield
- Charles (1607–1645)
- Edward (1607–1614)
- William (1608–1614)
- Thomas (died young)
- George (1610–1616)
- Ferdinando (d. 1643), married Lettice Ferrers and had issue. He was an M.P. and had three children
- Philip; commander of the Royalist garrison of Shelford Manor, killed when it was stormed on 3 November 1645;
- Sarah (d. May 1698), married Sir Richard Hoghton, 3rd Baronet
- Michael (1624–1648)
- Elizabeth, married Edward Darcy
- Arthur (1627–1694) M.P. for Nottingham from whom the fifth Earl and succeeding earls of Chesterfield descend

After the death of his first wife, he married Anne Packington, daughter of John Pakington (died 1625), with whom he had one son -

- Alexander (1638–1707), diplomat, who married Catherine Burghill and had children:
  - Mary (c.1686 – 1762), who in turn married Viscount Fane
  - James (1673–1721), a soldier-statesman and 1st Earl Stanhope

Peerage of England
New title	Earl of Chesterfield; 1628–1656	Succeeded by Philip Stanhope
New title	Baron Stanhope of Shelford; 1616–1656	Succeeded by Philip Stanhope
