= Rowton, Cheshire =

Village in Cheshire, England

Coordinates: 53.173°N 2.83°W

Rowton
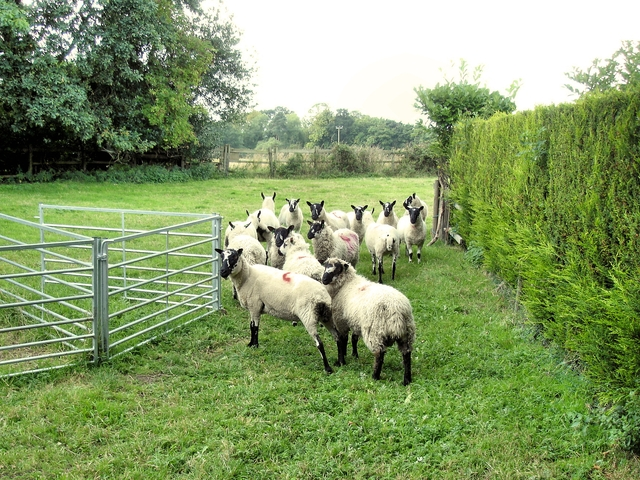
- Footpath near Hall Farm

- Location within Cheshire
- Population: 441 (2011 census)
- OS grid reference: SJ4464
- Civil parish: Rowton
- Unitary authority: Cheshire West and Chester
- Ceremonial county: Cheshire
- Region: North West
- Country: England
- Sovereign state: United Kingdom
- Post town: CHESTER
- Postcode district: CH3
- Dialling code: 01244
- Police: Cheshire
- Fire: Cheshire
- Ambulance: North West
- UK Parliament: Chester South and Eddisbury

Rowton is a village and civil parish on the outskirts of Chester, in the unitary authority of Cheshire West and Chester and ceremonial county of Cheshire, England. It is located between Christleton and Waverton, near the A41 road. The Rowton Hall hotel is the most prominent landmark in the village. At the 2001 census Rowton had a population of 497, decreasing to 441 in the 2011 census.

The Battle of Rowton Heath took place in the village on 24 September 1645 during the English Civil War. It resulted in a decisive Parliamentarian victory over a Royalist army commanded in person by Charles I.

Rowton was previously a township in Christleton parish of Broxton Hundred, becoming a civil parish in 1866. Its population was recorded at 88 in 1801, 122 in 1851, 205 in 1901 and 228 in 1951.

== See also ==
- Listed buildings in Rowton, Cheshire
