= Marmaduke Langdale, 1st Baron Langdale of Holme =

English landowner and soldier

The Right Honourable The Lord Langdale
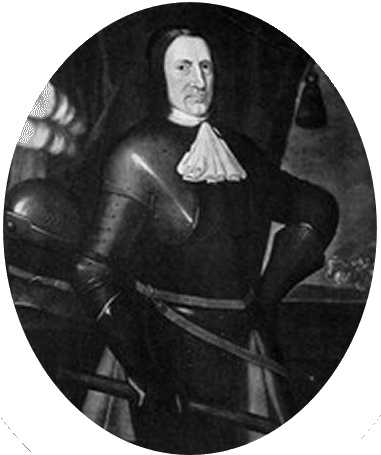
- Marmaduke Langdale, 1st Baron Langdale of Holme

Lord Lieutenant of the West Riding of Yorkshire
- In office 1660–1661

Sheriff of Yorkshire
- In office 1639–1640

Personal details
- Born: 1598 (baptised) Beverley, Yorkshire
- Died: 4 August 1661 (aged 63) Holme Hall, Yorkshire
- Resting place: All Saints church, Sancton
- Party: Royalist
- Spouse: Lenox Rodes (died 1639)
- Children: 4 sons, 3 daughters; four survived to adulthood
- Education: St John's College, Cambridge
- Occupation: Landowner and soldier

Military service
- Allegiance: England
- Rank: Colonel
- Unit: The Northern Horse
- Battles/wars: Palatinate campaign Mannheim; Wars of the Three Kingdoms; Siege of Newcastle; Marston Moor; Relief of Pontefract Castle; Naseby; Rowton Heath; Preston; Siege of Candia

Marmaduke Langdale, 1st Baron Langdale (c. 1598 – 5 August 1661) was an English landowner and soldier who fought with the Royalists during the Wars of the Three Kingdoms.

An only child who inherited large estates, he served in the 1620 to 1622 Palatinate campaign before returning home; during the period of Personal Rule by Charles I from 1629 to 1640, he opposed both the Forced Loan and Ship Money. Nevertheless, when the civil war began in 1642 he joined the Royalist Northern Army, although with little enthusiasm.

He proved a talented commander of cavalry; after defeat at Marston Moor in 1644, he formed the survivors into the Northern Horse, which quickly gained a reputation for ill-discipline. After Royalist defeat in the Second English Civil War in 1648, he went into exile and served briefly in the Venetian army before forced to retire by sickness. In 1653, he converted to Catholicism and later resided in Lamspringe Abbey, Westphalia.

Created Baron Langdale in 1658 by Charles II, after The Restoration in 1660 he returned home and was appointed Lord Lieutenant of the West Riding of Yorkshire. His health and finances had been destroyed by the war and he died at his home of Holme Hall in August 1661.

== Family ==
Marmaduke Langdale was born in 1598, only son of Peter Langdale (d.1617) and his wife Anne Wharton (1576–1646), who in 1606 purchased Pighill Hall, Molescroft, near Beverley in Yorkshire. The name 'Langdale' allegedly came from the manor of Langdale in Yorkshire.

In 1626 Langdale married Lenox Rodes (d.1639), daughter of Sir John Rodes (1562–1639) of Barlborough Hall, Derbyshire; before she died in childbirth in 1639, they had seven children. Four of these survived to adulthood; sons Marmaduke (1627–1703) and Philip (died 1672), and daughters Lenox (died 1658) and Mary (died 1678).

== Career ==
Langdale attended St John's College, Cambridge in 1612 and inherited his father's estates in 1617. His sister-in-law Katherine was the first wife of Sir John Hotham (1589–1645); in 1620, the two went to Europe and briefly fought for Elizabeth of Bohemia, sister of Charles I. Sir John was appointed Parliamentarian Governor of Hull, Yorkshire in 1642 and executed for treason in 1645 along with his son John, whom Clarendon describes as a close friend.

During the 1620s and 1630s, Langdale became an increasingly important local political figure and was knighted in 1628; however, during the period of Personal Rule by Charles from 1629 to 1640, he opposed the Forced Loan and payment of Ship money. In 1638, the Earl of Strafford, Charles' chief minister and President of the Council of the North identified Langdale as a person of "ill affections to the Provincial, if not to the Regal Power". He was punished by being appointed Sheriff of Yorkshire in 1639, making him personally liable for any shortfalls in collecting the taxes. He eventually complied but was removed in July 1640 after organising a petition signed by leading members of the Yorkshire gentry listing their 'grievances'.

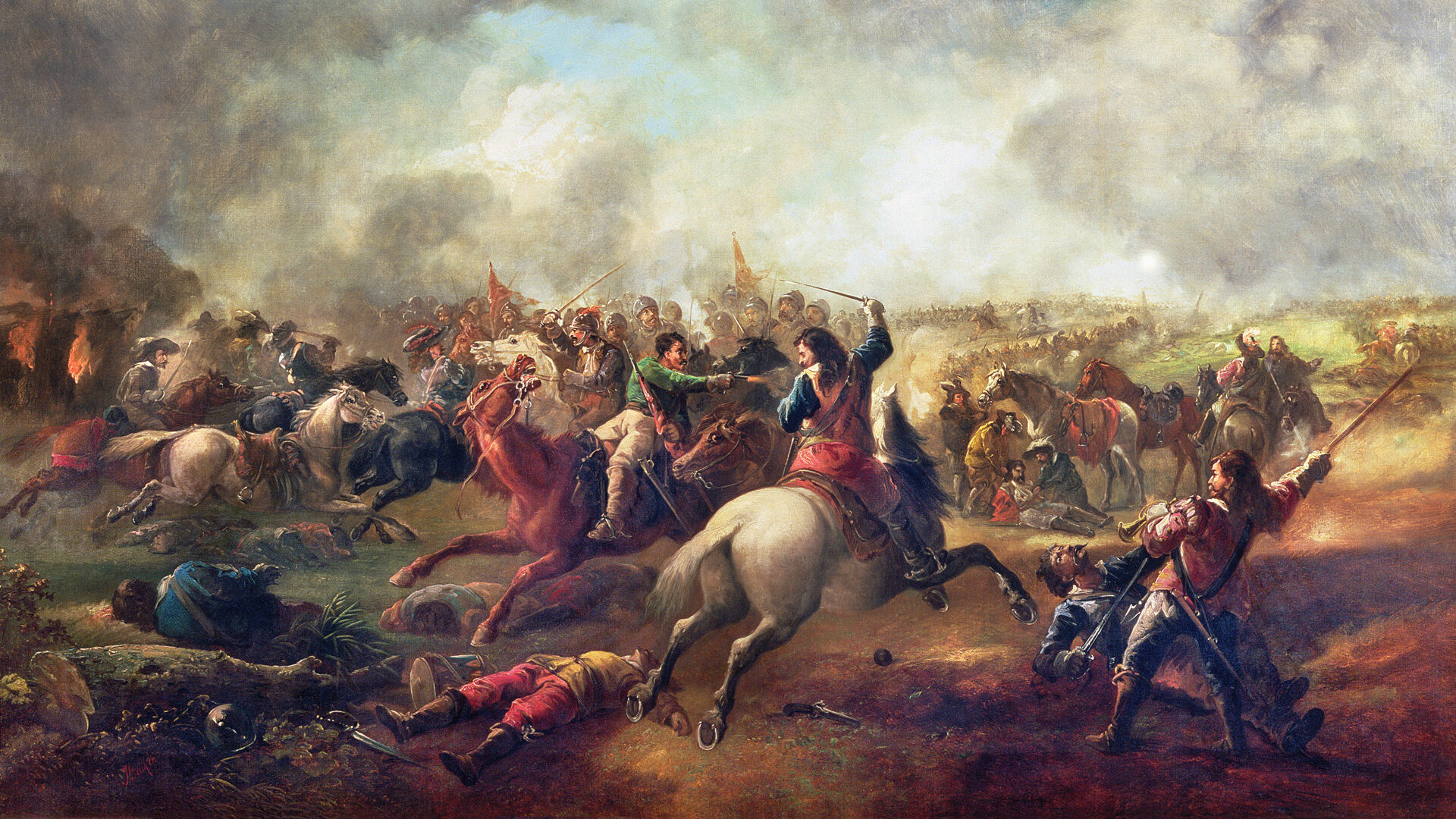
Battle of Marston Moor, July 1644; Langdale formed the Northern Horse from the survivors of this defeat

Langdale provides a good example of the complex motives driving individuals to choose a particular side during the War of the Three Kingdoms. Despite his previous opposition and ill-health, when the war began in August 1642 he joined the Royalists and fought under the Marquess of Newcastle, Royalist commander in Northern England. During the Siege of Newcastle in February 1644, he scattered the Covenanter cavalry at Corbridge, before the loss of Selby forced the main Royalist army to retreat into York. At the Battle of Marston Moor in July 1644, he commanded part of the Royalist left wing and after their defeat formed the surviving cavalry into the "Northern Horse". A collection of the remnants of an estimated 30 regiments, it was later described as a "rabble of gentility" and quickly gained a reputation for poor discipline.

In March 1645, Langdale dispersed a Parliamentarian force under John Lambert outside Wentbridge, and relieved Pontefract Castle, one of the last Royalist positions in the north. However, without infantry support, he was forced to retreat; the Northern Horse rejoined the main Royalist field army and formed the left wing at the Battle of Naseby in June. Although they initially held their ground against Oliver Cromwell's more numerous and better disciplined troopers, they were later outflanked and driven from the field.

The survivors of Naseby, which included the Northern Horse, withdrew to Raglan Castle in South Wales, but on 10 July the last significant Royalist field army in England was destroyed at the Battle of Langport. Langdale and other Yorkshire Royalists wanted to go north to link up with Montrose, who won a series of victories in Scotland from 1644 to 1645. Charles agreed but first insisted on relieving Chester, a port vital for communication with his Irish supporters; on 24 September the Royalists were defeated at the Battle of Rowton Heath.

Shortly after this, news came of Montrose's defeat at the Battle of Philiphaugh on 13 September. Langdale and Lord Digby escaped from Chester with about 2,400 cavalry, but on 15 October a Parliamentarian army intercepted and dispersed their forces at Sherburn-in-Elmet. Digby and Langdale escaped to France and the First English Civil War came to an end in June 1646. An alliance between Royalists, Parliamentarian moderates and the Scots led to the Second English Civil War in 1648; Langdale returned from exile to lead the Royalists in Cumberland and seized the border town of Berwick-upon-Tweed to enable his Scottish allies to invade England. In August, John Lambert, Parliamentarian commander in the North, was reinforced by Cromwell and Fairfax who had defeated Royalist risings in Wales and Southern England. Although Langdale linked up with the Scottish army under the Duke of Hamilton, they were decisively defeated at the Battle of Preston, over a period of three days between 17 and 19 August.

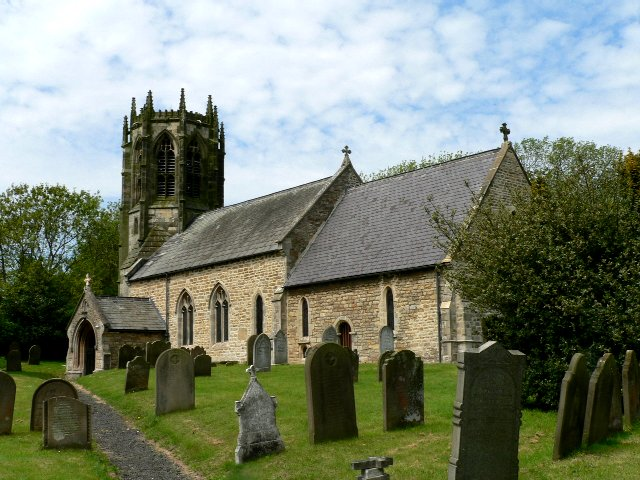
All Saints Church, Sancton, where Langdale was buried in 1661 (Note: His memorial reads Here lyeth the body of the Right Hon^{ble} Marmaduke L^{d} Langdale Baron of Holme in Spaldingmoore who dyed the fifth of August An(no) Dom(ini) 1661)

Along with much of the cavalry, Langdale and Hamilton evaded capture at Preston but were taken shortly afterwards and imprisoned in Nottingham Castle. The Second Civil War convinced Parliamentarians, including Cromwell, that peace could only be assured by the death of prominent Royalists; Hamilton was executed, as was Charles himself in January 1649. As one of seven Royalists excluded by name from pardon, Langdale avoided a similar fate by escaping dressed as a milkmaid and made his way to France once again.

Under the 1650 Treaty of Breda, the Covenanters agreed to restore Charles II to the English and Scots thrones but insisted on the exclusion of many who followed him into exile. As a result, Langdale did not participate in the Third English Civil War; he converted to Catholicism in 1652 and joined the army of the Republic of Venice but was forced to retire due to poor health. In 1655, poverty led him to take refuge at the English Benedictine Congregation at Lamspringe Abbey in Lower Saxony.

In 1658, Charles created him Baron Langdale; after the Restoration in 1660, he was appointed Lord Lieutenant of the West Riding of Yorkshire but claimed he was too poor to attend Charles' coronation. He died in August 1661 at Holme and was buried in All Saints Church, Sancton, where his memorial survives, along with others belonging to the Langdale family.

== Sources ==
- Baggs, A. P.; Brown, I. M.; Forster, G. C. F.; Hall, I.; Horrox, R. E. (1989). Allison, K. J. (ed.). 'Outlying townships: Molescroft', in A History of the County of York East Riding: Volume 6, the Borough and Liberties of Beverley. Victoria County History. ISBN 978-0197227763.
- Barratt, John. "A Rabble of Gentility? – The Northern Horse, 1644–45". Helion & Co; Military History. Archived from the original on 22 March 2019.
- Barratt, John (1975). "A Royalist Account of the Relief of Pontefract, 1st March 1645". Society for Army Historical Research. 53 (215): 159–169. JSTOR 44225367.
- Burke, John (2017) [1831]. A General and Heraldic Dictionary of the Peerages of England, Ireland, and Scotland, Extinct, Dormant, and in Abeyance. England (2017 ed.). Andesite Press. ISBN 978-1375518789.
- Cust, Richard (1985). "Charles I, the Privy Council, and the Forced Loan". Journal of British Studies. 24 (2): 208–235. doi:10.1086/385832. S2CID 143537267.
- Hopper, Andrew (2004). "Langdale, Marmaduke, first Baron Langdale". Oxford Dictionary of National Biography (online ed.). Oxford University Press. doi:10.1093/ref:odnb/16010. (Subscription, Wikipedia Library access or UK public library membership required.)
- Plant, David (2008). "The Siege of Chester and Battle of Rowton Heath". BCW Project.
- Plant, David (2008). "The Preston Campaign 1648". BCW Project.
- Royle, Trevor (2004). The Wars of the Three Kingdoms 1638–1660. Little, Brown. ISBN 978-0-316-86125-0.
- Sheehan, J. J.; Whellan, T. (1867). History and Topography of the City of York and the East Riding of Yorkshire, Volume II. John Green, Beverley.
- Young, Peter; Holmes, Richard (2000). The English Civil War:A Military History of the Three Civil Wars, 1642–1651. Wordsworth Editions. ISBN 978-1-84022-222-7.

Political offices
Preceded by Sir William Robinson	High Sheriff of Yorkshire; 1639–1640	Succeeded by Sir John Buck
New creation	Lord Lieutenant of the West Riding of Yorkshire; 1660–1661	Succeeded by 2nd Duke of Buckingham
Peerage of England
New creation	Baron Langdale; 1658–1661	Succeeded by Marmaduke Langdale
