= Holme Hall, East Riding of Yorkshire =

Country house in Holme-on-Spalding-Moor, East Riding of Yorkshire, England

Coordinates: 53.8364°N 0.7617°W

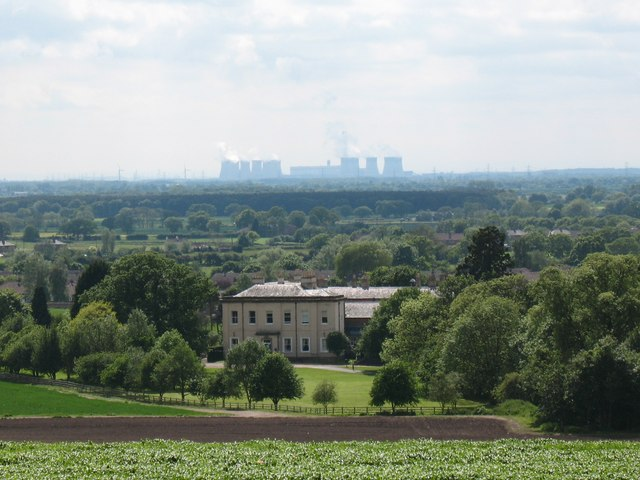
Holme Hall

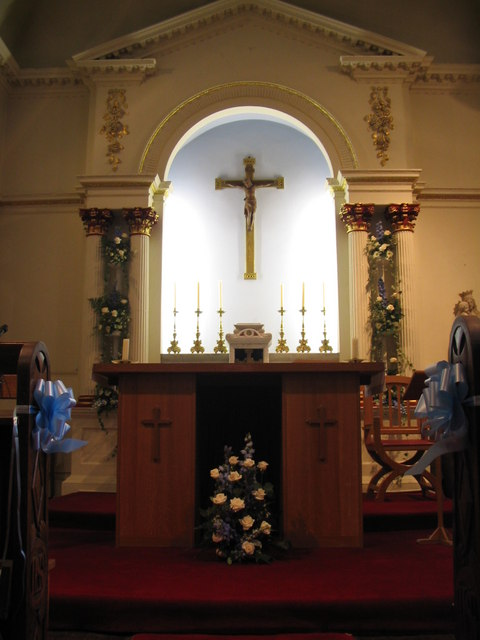
Roman Catholic chapel, Holme Hall

Holme Hall is a grade II* listed 18th-century country house in Holme-on-Spalding-Moor, East Riding of Yorkshire, England. It was then a Sue Ryder Care Home until its closure in February 2018.

The house was built c. 1720–30 to designs of William Wakefield for Lord Langdale, with a chapel added in 1766 by John Carr. It is constructed in two storeys of rendered brick with tile and Westmorland slate roofs, with a 5-bay frontage.

== History ==
The Langdale family have lived in the Beverley area since at least the fourteenth century, when Patrick de Langdale married Elena Houghton and inherited through her estates in Houghton and Etton. The estates passed to Marmaduke Langdale, who went to live at Holme-on-Spalding-Moor where he bought land from the crown that had belonged to the Constable family before the attainder of Robert Constable for his part in the Pilgrimage of Grace. He was a Royalist commander in the English Civil War and was forced to flee to the continent, where he joined Charles II and was created the 1st Baron Langdale of Holme in 1658. His eldest son, Marmaduke Langdale (b.1627), became governor of Hull and lived at Holme. He died in 1703 and his son inherited the Holme and Stourton estates, commissioning William Wakefield to renovate the Holme house around 1720. An adjacent Catholic chapel was added in 1766.

When the 5th Baron died in 1771 the title became extinct and the Holme estate passed to his grandson Philip Henry Joseph Stourton (1793–1860), younger son of Charles Philip Stourton, 17th Baron Stourton. Philip was a Justice of the Peace and Deputy Lieutenant for the East Riding. From him the estate passed via his son Henry Joseph (b. 1844) to the latter's daughter Amy Mary Josephine, who had married diplomat Frederick Dundas Harford. She sold it in 1920 to be used as a convent for the next fifty years.

It was taken over by Sue Ryder Care in 1981, who ran it as a residential care home for adults with neurological conditions. The home closed in February 2018.

== See also ==
- Grade II* listed buildings in the East Riding of Yorkshire
- Listed buildings in Holme-on-Spalding-Moor
