= Battle of Rowton Heath =

1645 battle of the First English Civil War

- Part of English Civil War
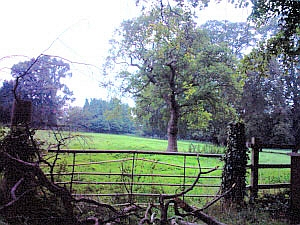
- Rowton Moor Battle Site
| Date | 24 September 1645 |
| Location | Rowton, Cheshire 53.1724°N 2.8284°W |
| Result | Parliamentarian victory |

Belligerents
| Royalists | Parliamentarians |

Commanders and leaders
| Marmaduke Langdale; Lord Bernard Stewart † | Sydenham Poyntz; Col. Michael Jones |

Strength
| 3,500 horse Unknown number of foot | 3,350 horse 500 musketeers |

Casualties and losses
| 600 killed 900 prisoners | Unknown |
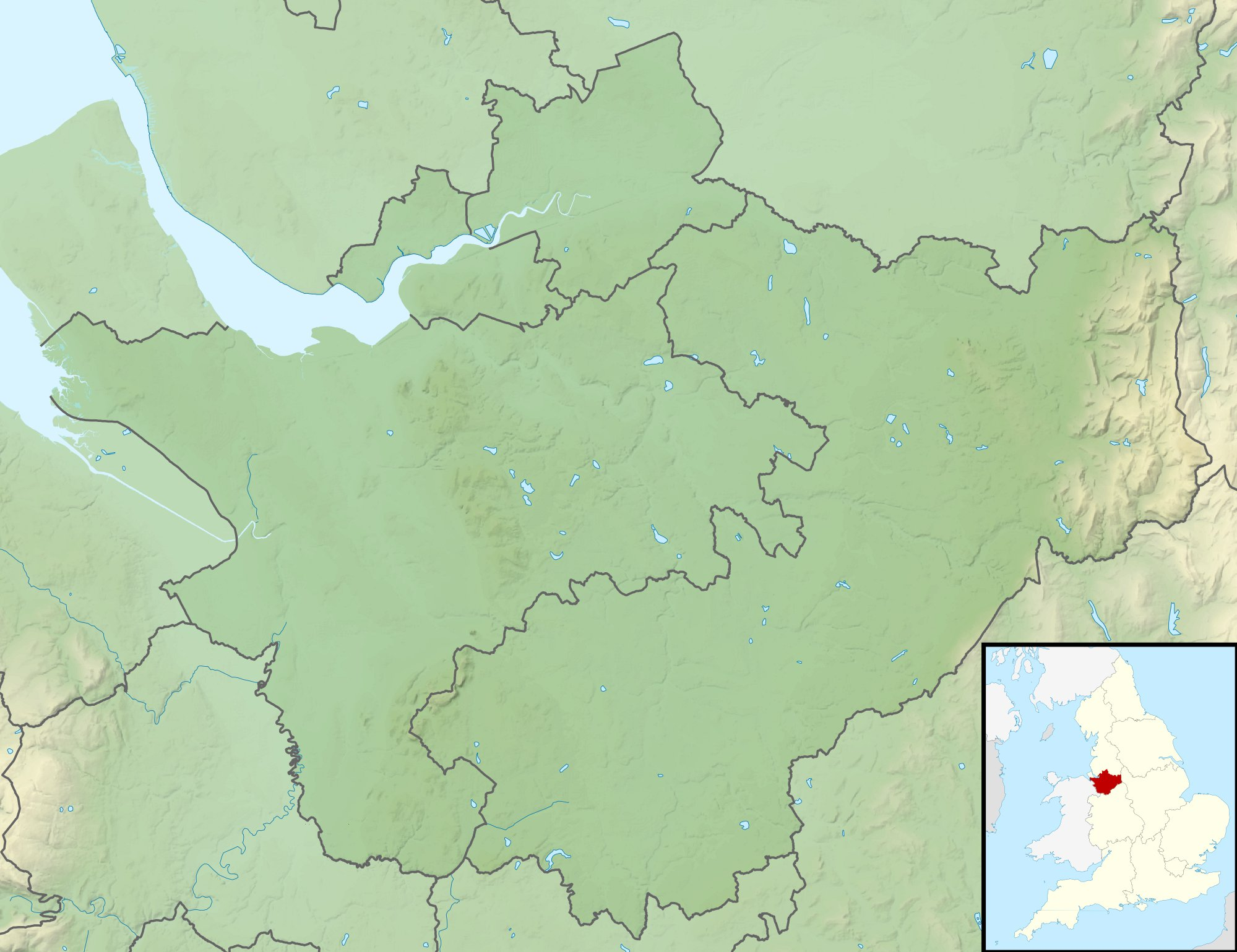
- Location within Cheshire

The Battle of Rowton Heath, better known as the Battle of Rowton Moor, occurred on 24 September 1645 during the English Civil War. The Parliamentarians, commanded by Sydnam Poyntz, inflicted a significant defeat on the Royalists under the personal command of King Charles I, inflicting heavy losses and preventing Charles from relieving the siege of Chester.

Before the battle, Charles had been attempting to link up with the Marquess of Montrose in Scotland following the Royalist defeat in the Battle of Naseby. Although his attempts were unsuccessful, they were disruptive enough that the Committee of Both Kingdoms ordered Sydnam Poyntz to pursue the King with approximately 3,000 horse. After Charles was informed that Chester, his only remaining port, was under siege, he marched intending to relieve the defenders, ordering 3,000 horse under the command of Marmaduke Langdale to camp outside the city while he and 600 others travelled into Chester itself on 23 September 1645. The intent was to attack the besieging Parliamentarians from both sides, Charles mistakenly believing that Poyntz had failed to follow them. In fact he was barely 15 miles (24 km) behind, and moved to attack Langdale's force in the early hours of 24 September. Although Langdale drove Poyntz off, the Parliamentarians besieging Chester sent reinforcements, and Langdale was forced to retreat to Rowton Heath, closer to Chester, and wait for his own reinforcements. This force, under Charles Gerard and Lord Bernard Stewart, was prevented from joining them, and Langdale was instead attacked by both Poyntz's force and the reinforcement. After being driven off the field and failing in an attempt to regroup at Chester itself, the Royalists retreated as dusk fell.

Royalist casualties were high, with 600 killed, including Stewart, and 900 taken prisoner. This defeat prevented Charles from relieving the defenders in Chester, which fell to the Parliamentarians on 3 February 1646.

== Background ==
Following the destruction of King Charles I's main army at the Battle of Naseby on 14 June 1645, the First English Civil War tilted decisively in favour of the Parliamentarians. Charles withdrew with his remaining forces to Raglan Castle in Wales, hoping to recruit new soldiers there and travel across the Bristol Channel to link up with George Goring, the only remaining Royalist commander of a significant force. The defeat of Goring at the Battle of Langport on 10 July, along with the subsequent "disintegration" of the new troops in South Wales, led to Charles abandoning this plan. Despite this and the loss of much of Northern England following the Battle of Marston Moor, Charles still had large numbers of soldiers in the West of England, and one of his supporters, the Marquess of Montrose, was winning a string of victories across Scotland.

The Royalist force attempted to join up with Montrose in Scotland. In early August, Charles took 2,500 soldiers and marched north, being forced to turn back at Doncaster by the advance of David Leslie and 4,000 cavalry. Charles's troops then made a raid into the Eastern Association, getting as far as Huntington and forcing the Parliamentarians besieging Hereford to withdraw. In response, the Committee of Both Kingdoms ordered Sydnam Poyntz to pursue the King. Evading Poyntz's forces, Charles again marched north on 18 September, taking 3,500 cavalry under William Vaughan and Lord Charles Gerrard as far as the River Wye at Presteigne. At this point, a messenger arrived to inform Charles that "part of the outworks of Chester were betrayed to the enemy", forcing him to change his plans and march towards Chester.

Chester had come under siege during December 1644, with a loose blockade or "leager" formed around the town. With Bristol now fallen to the Parliamentarians, Chester was the last port under Royalist control, and crucial for its links with recruiting efforts in Ireland and North Wales. On 20 September 1645, a force of 500 horse, 200 dragoons and 700 foot under the command of Michael Jones attacked the Royalist barricades, and with the defenders completely taken by surprise, they fell back to the inner city. On 22 September, Parliamentarian artillery began bombarding the city, and after breaching the walls (and having a summons to surrender refused by the defenders), the Parliamentarians attacked in two places. Both were repulsed, in one case because of the defenders counter-attacking on foot, and in the other because of the inadequate length of the attacker's scaling ladders preventing them from climbing the wall. Despite this success, the attacking Parliamentarian forces grew in strength while the defenders were weary; as such, the arrival of Charles and his force on 23 September was met with delight.

== Battle ==
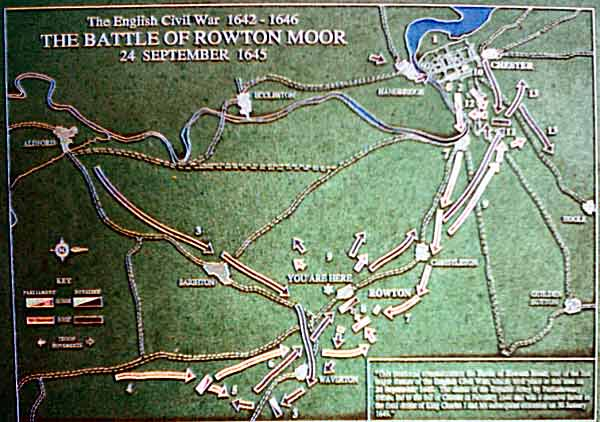
Rowton Moor Plan

Charles's force consisted of 3,500 horse, organised into four brigades, the largest grouping being the 1,200 soldiers of the Northern Horse under Sir Marmaduke Langdale. In addition, there was Gerard's brigade, consisting of 800 men who had served under him in South Wales, Sir William Vaughan's 1,000-strong brigade, and the 200 members of the Life Guards, Charles's personal bodyguard, under Lord Bernard Stewart. Although experienced, the troops were depleted in number, and had low morale following the recent string of defeats. Charles and Gerard evaded the loose Parliamentarian siege around the city, taking 600 men into Chester, while the approximately 3,000 remaining cavalry under Langdale crossed the River Dee at Holt and bivouacked at Hatton Heath, five miles to the south of Chester itself. The plan was to trap the besiegers between the two forces, destroying them or forcing them to retreat; as they numbered only 500 cavalry and 1,500 foot, this was considered to be relatively simple.

The Royalist plan failed to take into account Poyntz and his 3,000 cavalry; evidently, they assumed he had lost track of them. This assumption was mistaken, and as Charles entered Chester, Poyntz's soldiers arrived in Whitchurch, approximately 15 miles from Chester. After hearing about the situation, Poyntz promised to advance in the morning "with a considerable body of horse", which encouraged the Parliamentarians around Chester to continue resisting. One of his messengers was intercepted by Sir Richard Lloyd, however, who immediately sent a message to Charles and Langdale. After a brief Council of War, they resolved that Gerard's force and the Lifeguards, along with 500 foot, would advance to either join with Langdale or prevent Colonel Jones's forces linking up with Poyntz. Charles would remain in Chester, and watch the ensuing battle from a tower in Chester's defences, later known as King Charles' Tower.

=== Hatton Heath ===
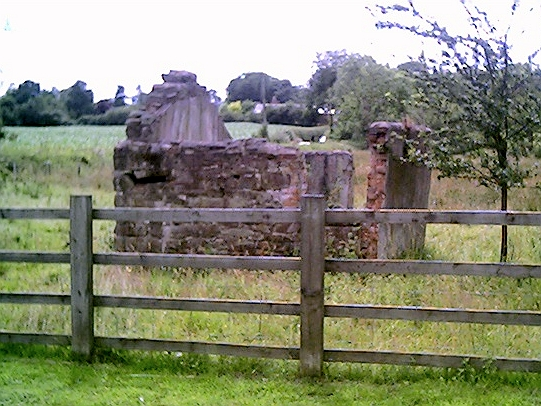
This 17th-century building on the side of the A41 was used as a wound dressing station during the battle

Langdale advanced northwards with 3,000 cavalry, and at Miller's Heath on the morning of 24 September he became aware of Poyntz's force of 3,000 also moving north. Miller's Heath was mainly made up of unenclosed heath, traversed by the Whitchurch–Chester Road, which was surrounded by hedges. Langdale lined the hedgerows with dragoons and dismounted troopers with carbines, and because of the inaccuracy of Parliamentarian reconnaissance, Poyntz was unaware of Langdale's presence until the dragoons opened fire on his vanguard at approximately 7:00 am.

As a result of Poyntz's lack of preparation, his force was strung out in a column; because of the boggy ground, they could not easily dismount. In addition, Poyntz had underestimated the strength of the Royalists and tried attacking with those troops immediately available, assuming they would be sufficient to charge and destroy the enemy. In this Poyntz was mistaken. Because the vanguard was entangled with Royalist troops, it was unable to make any significant progress, and it took approximately half an hour of close-quarters fighting in the mouth of the Whitchurch–Chester Road to force the Royalists back. As the Parliamentarians deployed onto the open ground to pursue the Royalists, they were set on by a fresh group of troops and forced to retreat, and with no reinforcements available, Poyntz retreated. On the Parliamentarian side, this skirmish led to the deaths of 20 soldiers, with a number of wounded and between 50 and 60 prisoners.

The Royalists, while losing fewer soldiers, were now in a precarious position, since reinforcements from Chester were needed to follow up on the success and defeat Poyntz's force. Langdale sent Lieutenant Colonel Jeffrey Shakerley to report to Charles, requesting reinforcements. Shakerley crossed the Dee using a washtub as a makeshift boat, rather than make a detour of 10 mi (16 km) via Holt Bridge, and arrived in Chester and delivered his message after 15 minutes, but no orders were issued for a further six hours after that. Barratt speculates that one reason could have been the fatigue of the Royalist troops, and another the rivalries amongst the Royalist commanders: Gerard and Digby opposed each other, with Byron and other commanders disliking Langdale; and Charles not being strong enough to stop the disputes. The Parliamentarians, however, did send support: at approximately 2:00 pm, the Chester forces dispatched 350 horse and 400 musketeers under Colonels Michael Jones and John Booth to reinforce Poyntz.

=== Rowton Heath ===
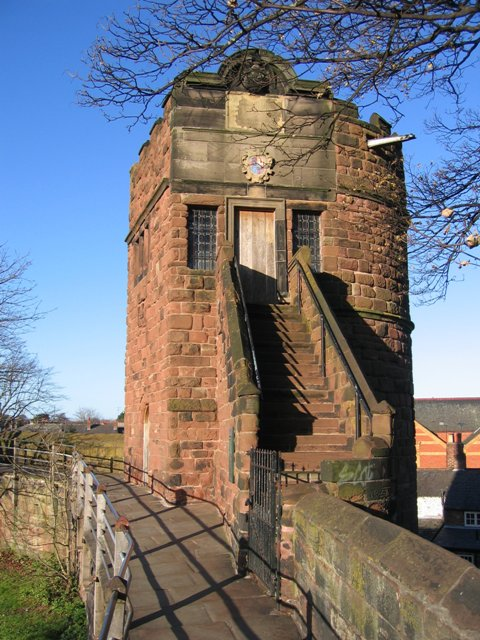
Phoenix Tower on Chester city walls, from where Charles is said to have watched his army lose.

The Royalists in Chester saw the Parliamentarian reinforcements under Jones and Booth advance, and sent Shakerley to warn Langdale's force. After receiving the message, Langdale withdrew nearer to Chester, reforming at Rowton Heath, an entirely open space. At the same time the Royalists in Chester began to move, with Gerard advancing with 500 foot and 500 cavalry. Gerard hoped to attack Jones's force from the rear, but the Parliamentarians responded by dispatching 200 cavalry and 200 infantry to prevent this. With a shorter distance to travel, this force met Gerard on Hoole Heath, and after a confused engagement in which Lord Bernard Stewart was slain, Gerard's force was prevented from marching to Langdale's aid. Instead, Jones and Booth linked up with Poyntz, giving a combined Parliamentarian force of 3,000 horse and 500 musketeers against a tired Royalist army of approximately 2,500 horse. At approximately 4:00 pm Poyntz advanced, covered by the musketeers firing a full volley.

Despite Langdale's attempt to counter-charge, the Royalists were soon outflanked. With the Parliamentarian musketeers firing into the rear of Langdale's force, the Royalists broke, some escaping via Holt Bridge and others running towards Chester. On Hoole Heath these retreating soldiers met with part of Gerard's force and made an initially successful counter-attack before being forced back to the walls of Chester. There the retreating cavalry choked up the streets, allowing the Parliamentarian musketeers to fire into the confused mass of horsemen and leading to a rout.

== Aftermath ==
Rowton Heath has been called "a major disaster" for Charles, with casualties estimated at 600 dead and 900 injured, including 50 members of the Life Guard and Lord Bernard. Parliamentarian losses were also heavy, although unknown, and the battle did give Chester some respite. Despite this, Charles withdrew the next day with the remaining 2,400 horse, heading to Denbigh Castle before moving on to Newark-on-Trent. With this retreat, Chester was left without additional support, and surrendered to the Parliamentarians on 3 February 1646. The remaining Royalist cavalry were eventually destroyed in their entirety when Poyntz ambushed them at the Battle of Sherburn in Elmet on 15 October 1645.

== See also ==
- History of Cheshire
