= 101.8 FM =

FM radio frequency

The following radio stations broadcast on FM frequency 101.8 MHz:

== China ==
- CNR Golden Radio in Beijing
- CNR The Voice of China in Changzhi and Zhenjiang

== Israel ==
- Kan Reka in Beersheba, Eilat and Haifa

== United Kingdom ==
- Branch FM in Dewsbury
- Cross Rhythms in Stoke-on-Trent
- Greatest Hits Radio Derbyshire in Wirksworth and Uttoxeter
- Greatest Hits Radio Surrey & East Hampshire in Petersfield
- Heart North East in Tyne and Wear
- Stoke Mandeville Hospital Radio
- Vixen 101 in Market Weighton
- WCR FM in Wolverhampton
