= Wesley Centre, Market Weighton =

Chapel in Market Weighton, East Riding of Yorkshire, England

Coordinates: 53°51′53″N 0°40′06″W

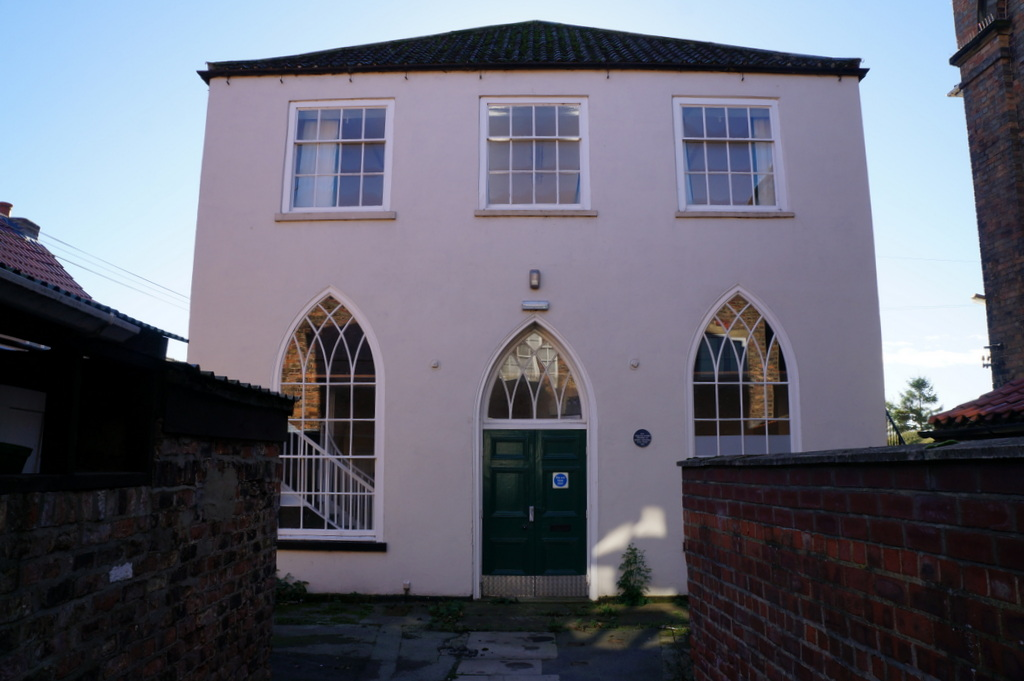
The building, in 2013

The Wesley Centre is a historic former Methodist chapel in Market Weighton, a town in the East Riding of Yorkshire, in England.

The chapel was built in 1786. On 23 June 1788, John Wesley preached in the chapel. By 1851, it could seat 345 worshippers and had a typical weekly attendance of 340 across two services. In 1868, a new chapel was built in front, closer to the road. The old chapel was later converted into a warehouse, but in 2012 it was refurbished to provide meeting space for the newer chapel. The old chapel, the oldest surviving Methodist chapel in the East Riding, was grade II listed in 1967.

The former chapel is in rendered and colourwashed red brick with a hipped pantile roof. There are two storeys and fronts of three and four bays. On the entrance front is a doorway with a pointed head and a fanlight with intersecting glazing. The windows are sashes, those in the ground floor with pointed heads and intersecting glazing. Inside, the original staircase survives.

== See also ==
- Listed buildings in Market Weighton
