= Umpleby (surname) =

Umpleby is an English surname, originally given to people from Anlaby in East Yorkshire. Notable people with this surname include:

- Jim Umpleby (born 1958), American businessman
- Stuart Umpleby (born 1944), American cybernetician
- William Umpleby Kirk (1843–1928), English pioneer photographer
