= Bay Horse, Market Weighton =

Pub in Market Weighton, East Riding of Yorkshire, England

The pub, in 2020

The Bay Horse is a historic pub in Market Weighton, a town in the East Riding of Yorkshire, in England.

The building was constructed in the mid 18th century and was later extended to the left. The building was grade II listed in 1986. Inside, one room is a bar, and the other is focused on dining. The pub has been used for meetings of the local Rotary Club.

The public house is in rendered and colourwashed brick, and has a tile roof with a raised gable on the right. There are two storeys and three bays. On the front are two doorways with pilasters, and the windows are sashes, those on the ground floor with cambered channelled wedge lintels.

== See also ==
- Listed buildings in Market Weighton
