= List of shipwrecks in August 1878 =

The list of shipwrecks in August 1878 includes ships sunk, foundered, grounded, or otherwise lost during August 1878.

== 1 August ==
List of shipwrecks: 1 August 1878
Ship	State	Description
India	United Kingdom	The steamship ran aground at Yenikale, Russia. She was refloated on 3 August.
Juliet	United Kingdom	The barque ran aground on the Isla de los Estados, Chile and was wrecked with the loss of a crew member. Survivors were rescued by the brig Thetis (Germany). Juliet was on a foaye from San Francisco, California, United States to London.
L. B. Gilchrist	United States	The full-rigged ship was driven ashore at Dungeness, Kent, United Kingdom. She was on a voyage from Söderhamn, Sweden to Bristol, Gloucestershire, United Kingdom. She was refloated with the assistance of two tugs and resumed her voyage.
Premier	United States	The full-rigged ship was driven ashore east of Dunkirk, Nord, France and was severely damaged. She was refloatedon 28 August and towed in to Dunkirk.
Ville Besnard	France	The ship ran aground at Söderhamn. She was refloated.
877	Russia	The lighter sprang a leak and sank at Kronstadt.

== 2 August ==
List of shipwrecks: 2 August 1878
Ship	State	Description
Abeille	France	The barque ran aground on the Burroughs, in the Thames Estuary. She was on a voyage from Helsinki, Grand Duchy of Finland to Saint-Malo, Ille-et-Vilaine. She was refloated and taken in to Gravesend, Kent, United Kingdom in a leaky condition.
Bereg	Austria-Hungary	The barque sprang a leak and was beached 4 nautical miles (7.4 km) west of Berdianski, Russia.
Evening Star	United Kingdom	The brig ran aground on the Maplin Sand, in the North Sea off the coast of Essex. She was refloated the next day with assistance from the barge Gregory (United Kingdom) and two tugs and anchored off Southend Pier, Essex.
Hannah	United Kingdom	The trow sank off Avonmouth, Somerset with the loss of one of her three crew. She was on a voyage from Cardiff, Glamorgan to Bristol, Gloucestershire.
Harlaw	New South Wales	The ship ran aground and was wrecked at Shanghai, China. At least some of her crew survived. She was on a voyage from Sydney to Shanghai.
Hendrika	Netherlands	The galiot was run down and sunk in the English Channel 6 nautical miles (11 km) off Dover, Kent by the barque Edith (United States). One crew member was rescued by a Kingsdown boat.
Princess Victoria	United Kingdom	The ship struck rocks at Seaton, County Durham. She was on a voyage from the River Tyne to Sundsvall, Sweden. She was refloated and towed in to Blyth, Northumberland in a leaky condition.
Thor	Norway	The barque was driven ashore at "Kallboda", Grand Duchy of Finland.
Voltigeur	Belgium	The fishing boat sprang a leak and foundered in the North Sea 15 nautical miles (28 km) south of Bridlington, Yorkshire, United Kingdom. Her crew were rescued by Anenome (United Kingdom.
William H. Allen	United States	While on an Arctic trading voyage from Honolulu, Kingdom of Hawaii, the 157-ton brig sank in the Arctic Ocean off Cape Smyth, Department of Alaska (71°17′35″N 156°47′15″W), after ice stove in her hull.

== 3 August ==
List of shipwrecks: 3 August 1878
Ship	State	Description
Bee	United Kingdom	The brig ran aground at Lindisfarne, Northumberland. She was refloated and taken in to Lindisfarne.
Cingalese	United Kingdom	The steamship was driven ashore at Cabrita Point, Spain. She was on a voyage from Odesa, Russia to Antwerp, Belgium. She was abandoned the next day and broke up.
Curlew	United Kingdom	The yacht was severely damaged in a thunderstorm at Llandudno, Caernarfonshire.
Dagmar	United Kingdom	The yacht sank in a thunderstorm at Llandudno. Her crew survived.
Empress	United Kingdom	The Thames barge was run into by another vessel and sank in The Swale off Elmley Ferry, Isle of Sheppey, Kent with the loss of a crew member. She was refloated on 10 November.
Esperia	United Kingdom	The schooner was driven ashore and wrecked at Cahore, County Wexford. Her crew survived.
Irene	United Kingdom	The yacht was driven ashore and wrecked at Great Orme Head, Caernarfonshire.
Jessie	United Kingdom	The Mersey Flat was driven ashore at Liverpool, Lancashire.
Mazeppa	United Kingdom	The fishing smack was driven ashore at Dover, Kent.
Nautilus	United Kingdom	The yacht was severely damaged in a thunderstorm at Llandudno.
Nellie Carr	United States	The schooner foundered off Catalina Island, Dominican Republic. Her crew survived. She was on a voyage from Curaçao, Curaçao and Dependencies to Portsmouth, New Hampshire.

== 4 August ==
List of shipwrecks: 4 August 1878
Ship	State	Description
Almira Coombs	United States	The barque was driven ashore and wrecked at Port Elizabeth, Cape Colony. Her crew survived.
Leonore	United Kingdom	The barque was driven ashore and wrecked at "Puloe Napier", Billiton Island, Netherlands East Indies. Her crew survived. She was on a voyage from Singapore, Straits Settlements to Marseille, Bouches-du-Rhône, France.
Mary Lloyds	United Kingdom	The ship was abandoned in the Irish Sea. She was towed in to Milford Haven, Pembrokeshire the next day by the steamship Ant (United Kingdom).
Petronella	Netherlands	The barque was driven ashore and wrecked at Port Elizabeth. She was on a voyage from Makassar, Netherlands East Indies to Amsterdam, North Holland.
Robert Portner	United Kingdom	The ship was beached on "Cacos Island", in the Andaman Islands. She was on a voyage from Rangoon, Burma to the English Channel.
Zenobia	United Kingdom	The barque was wrecked at "Tabiah", on the Barbary Coast. Her crew survived.

== 5 August ==
List of shipwrecks: 5 August 1878
Ship	State	Description
Blenheim	United Kingdom	The steamship ran aground on the West Beck Reef, off Bic, Quebec, Canada. Her 33 crew were rescued. She was on a voyage from Newport, Monmouthshire to Montreal, Quebec. She was consequently condemned.
Mary	Germany	The schooner was driven ashore and wrecked at Maassluis, South Holland, Netherlands. Her crew were rescued.
Milo	United Kingdom	The smack collided with a barque and sank in the North Sea 15 nautical miles (28 km) east of the Spurn Lightship ( Trinity House). Her four crew were rescued the next day by the smack Unity (United Kingdom).

== 6 August ==
List of shipwrecks: 6 August 1878
Ship	State	Description
Assyria	United Kingdom	The steamship ran aground in the River Parrett at Dunball, Somerset. She was on a voyage from Bristol, Gloucestershire to Glasgow, Renfrewshire. She was refloated the next day and resumed her voyage.
Brigitta	Germany	The schooner ran aground on the Sand Kallan, in the Baltic Sea off the coast of the Grand Duchy of Finland. She was on a voyage from Kronstadt, Russia to Wisbech, Cambridgeshire, United Kingdom. She was refloated and towed in to Helsinki, Grand Duchy of Finland.
Martina	Sweden	The schooner was driven ashore 2 nautical miles (3.7 km) north of Berwick upon Tweed, Northumberland, United Kingdom and was severely damaged. She was on a voyage from Karlskrona to Middlesbrough, Yorkshire, United Kingdom. She was refloated and towed in to Berwick upon Tweed by the tug Tweed (United Kingdom).

== 7 August ==
List of shipwrecks: 7 August 1878
Ship	State	Description
Fidele	France	The schooner ran aground on the Longsand, in the North Sea off the coast of Essex, United Kingdom. She was on a voyage from Uddevalla, Sweden to Le Tréport, Seine-Inférieure. She was refloated and resumed her voyage.
Margaret	United Kingdom	The ship foundered off Wigton, Cumberland with the loss of all three crew. She was on a voyage from "Aye" to Waterford.
Summer Cloud	United Kingdom	The ship ran aground at Wick, Caithness. She was refloated and taken in to Wick in a leaky condition.

== 8 August ==
List of shipwrecks: 8 August 1878
Ship	State	Description
Beech	United Kingdom	The steamship ran aground at Brăila, United Principalities. She was on a voyage from Brăila to Naples, Italy.
Thomas	United Kingdom	The dandy struck a sunken rock and was wrecked in the Rodefjord, Iceland. Her crew were rescued.

== 10 August ==
List of shipwrecks: 10 August 1878
Ship	State	Description
Alice Walls	United Kingdom	The barque sprang a leak. She was assisted in to Grimsby, Lincolnshire in waterlogged condition and beached.
Anna Lucretia	United Kingdom	The ship was abandoned at sea. Her crew were rescued by the steamship Deutscher Kaiser (Germany).
Conway	United Kingdom	The brig was driven ashore 65 nautical miles (120 km) south of São Paulo, Brazil. Her crew were rescued. She was on a voyage from Glasgow, Renfrewshire to Natal, Brazil.
Stirling	United Kingdom	The steamship was severely damaged by fire at Kronstadt, Russia.
Vadren	Norway	The barque was driven ashore at São Paulo.

== 12 August ==
List of shipwrecks: 12 August 1878
Ship	State	Description
F. W. Harris	United Kingdom	The steamship was driven ashore at Philadelphia, Pennsylvania. She was on a voyage from Philadelphia to Antwerp, Belgium. She was refloated and resumed her voyage, but struck a sunken wreck. She continued her voyage in a leaky condition.
Glad Tidings	United Kingdom	The ship ran aground at Liverpool, Lancashire. She was on a voyage from St. George to Liverpool. She was refloated.
Jacob Christensen	Norway	The barque collided with a German steamship and sank off Rungsted, Denmark.
Maid of Kent	United Kingdom	The schooner was driven ashore at Shoeburyness, Essex. She was on a voyage from Margate, Kent to London.

== 13 August ==
List of shipwrecks: 13 August 1878
Ship	State	Description
HMY Alberta, Ida, and HMS Lively	Royal Navy; United Kingdom; Royal Navy	The Royal Yacht HMY Alberta was run into by HMS Lively at West Cowes, Isle of Wight and was damaged. HMS Lively then run down and sank the cutter Ida before running aground herself. HMS Lively was refloated and taken into Portsmouth, Hampshire, where she collided with and capsized a boat. Those on board were rescued by HMS Lively.
Juliane	United Kingdom	The ship ran aground at Cape Town, Cape Colony.
Marion	United Kingdom	The barque was destroyed by fire in the Grand Banks of Newfoundland. Her crew were rescued by the barque Charles R. Lewis (United States). Marion was on a voyage from Greenock, Renfrewshire to Quebec City, Canada.

== 14 August ==
List of shipwrecks: 14 August 1878
Ship	State	Description
Armenia	United States	The schooner dragged anchor in heavy seas and stranded on Whale Rock in West Bay, Narragansett, Rhode Island. She was wrecked. Her crew of six were rescued by the United States Life Saving Service.

== 15 August ==
List of shipwrecks: 15 August 1878
Ship	State	Description
Albert	United Kingdom	The steamship ran aground at Bishop's Quay, Helford River, Cornwall. She was refloated two days later.
Kaiuma	New Zealand	The schooner left Waitara for Auckland on 14 August and is believed to have foundered close to Raglan on the following day. Wreckage was discovered along the coast around and after that date. It is thought the Kaiuma had a crew of seven.
Leverrier	United Kingdom	The steamship ran aground at South Shields, County Durham. She was refloated the next day.
Merlin	New Zealand	The 41-ton schooner stranded and became a wreck on Stephens Island in Cook Strait. All hands survived.
Palmetta	Italy	The barque was wrecked at Aracaty, Brazil. She was on a voyage from Pernambuco to Ceará.

== 16 August ==
List of shipwrecks: 16 August 1878
Ship	State	Description
Chief Templar	(United Kingdom of Great Britain and Ireland) Isle of Man	The fishing vessel was run into by another vessel and sank. Her crew were rescued by Fear Not ( (United Kingdom of Great Britain and Ireland) Isle of Man).
Don Juan	United Kingdom	The schooner was driven ashore on Skokholm, Pembrokeshire and sank. Her four crew survived.
Electra	United Kingdom	The ship ran aground on the Abertay Sands, at the mouth of the River Tay. She was on a voyage from Dundee, Forfarshire to Amble, Northumberland. She floated off and resumed her voyage.
Henry	United Kingdom	The schooner was driven ashore at the Ness of Duncansby, Caithness.
Libuka	Austria-Hungary	The brig was wrecked at the mouth of the Tonalá River. Her crew were rescued.
Several unnamed vessels	Flags unknown	The ships were driven ashore at "Inspan" in a hurricane with loss of life. There were four survivors.

== 17 August ==
List of shipwrecks: 17 August 1878
Ship	State	Description
Ebenezer	United Kingdom	The fishing smack was struck by a boat and foundered in Robin Hoods Bay. Her five crew were rescued.

== 18 August ==
List of shipwrecks: 18 August 1878
Ship	State	Description
Electra	United Kingdom	The steamship ran aground at the mouth of the Gironde and was beached in a sinking condition.
Goldfinger	United Kingdom	The barque ran aground on the Shipwash Sand, in the North Sea off the coast of Suffolk. She was on a voyage from the River Tyne to Cartagena, Spain. She was refloated the next day with the assistance of a tug and six smacks and taken in to Harwich, Essex.

== 19 August ==
List of shipwrecks: 19 August 1878
Ship	State	Description
Australian Packet	New South Wales	The ship was wrecked on Epi Island, New Hebrides. Her crew were rescued.
Maria and Delfina	Italy	The brig ran aground on the Cross Sand, in the North Sea off the coast on Norfolk, United Kingdom. She was on a voyage from Morant Bay, Jamaica to Goole, Yorkshire, United Kingdom. She was refloated and taken in to Great Yarmouth, Norfolk in a leaky condition.
Pacific	United Kingdom	The ship ran aground in the Bute Channel. She was on a voyage from Cardiff, Glamorgan to Valparaíso, Chile.

== 20 August ==
List of shipwrecks: 20 August 1878
Ship	State	Description
Alpine	United Kingdom	The ship was sighted in the Atlantic Ocean whilst on a voyage from Penarth, Glamorgan to Singapore, Straits Settlements. No further trace, reported overdue.
Post Boy	United Kingdom	The ship was driven ashore and wrecked at Pendine, Carmarthenshire.

== 22 August ==
List of shipwrecks: 22 August 1878
Ship	State	Description
Charlotte Helen	United Kingdom	The schooner collided with the steamship Rambler (United Kingdom) and sank south of Cape Finisterre, Spain with the loss of three of her crew. Survivors were rescued by Rambler. Charlotte Helen was on a voyage from Seville, Spain to Carrickfergus, County Antrim.
Francis and Mary	United Kingdom	The schooner ran aground in the River Boyne and was wrecked.

== 23 August ==
List of shipwrecks: 23 August 1878
Ship	State	Description
Dinnington	United Kingdom	The steamship ran aground at Whitgift, Yorkshire. She was on a voyage from Goole, Yorkshire to Hamburg, Germany. She was refloated and taken in to Blacktoft, Yorkshire.
Southport	United Kingdom	The barque was wrecked on Back Beach, Durban, Natal Colony. during a storm. The remains of the ship and the salvaged cargo was sold for £1,460.

== 24 August ==
List of shipwrecks: 24 August 1878
Ship	State	Description
Augusta Elsa	Flag unknown	The ship was driven ashore at Dungeness, Kent, United Kingdom. She was on a voyage from Antwerp, Belgium to Havana, Cuba. She was refloated and towed in to The Down.
Dione	United Kingdom	The ship was driven ashore at Karawang, Netherlands East Indies. She was on a voyage from Batavia to Tegal. She was refloated and resumed her voyage.
First Lancashire	United Kingdom	The ship ran aground at Galle, Ceylon and sprang a leak. She was on a voyage from Dundee, Forfarshire to Galle.
Gateshead	United Kingdom	The barque was driven ashore and wrecked at North Shields, Northumberland. She was on a voyage from London to Newcastle upon Tyne, Northumberland.
Johann	Germany	The schooner sank off Dagerort, Courland Governorate. Her crew were rescued. She was on a voyage from Saint Petersburg, Russia to the Weser.
Savant Servan	France	The brig collided with George Bell (United Kingdom) and sank off the coast of the United States.
Summerlee	United Kingdom	The steamship was severely damaged by an onboard explosion. Two of her crew were severely injured. She was on a voyage from Cardiff, Glamorgan to Bordeaux, Gironde, France. She put back to Cardiff.
Themis	Norway	The barque ran aground at Söderhamn, Sweden and became severely leaky.
Vernon	United Kingdom	The steamship ran aground on the Stapelbotten, in the Baltic Sea. She was refloated with assistance from the steamships Dwina and Hotspur (both Russia) and taken in to Riga, Russia for temporary repairs.

== 25 August ==
List of shipwrecks: 25 August 1878
Ship	State	Description
Bittern	United Kingdom	The steamship was wrecked at Cape Finisterre, Spain with the loss of all but two of her crew. She was on a voyage from Porto, Portugal to Liverpool, Lancashire.
H. D. Stover	United States	The brig was driven ashore at Port Natal, Natal Colony.

== 26 August ==
List of shipwrecks: 26 August 1878
Ship	State	Description
Athlete	United Kingdom	The steamship ran aground between Oliva and Dénia. Spain. She was on a voyage from Valencia to Dénia.
Carlton	United Kingdom	The ship was wrecked on "Browse Island". All on board were rescued.
James Drake, and Widgeon	United Kingdom	The steamships collided in the River Thames and both ran aground. James Drake was on a voyage from Kronstadt, Russia to London. She was refloated and towed in to Gravesend, Kent. Widgeon was on a voyage from London to Hamburg, Germany.

== 27 August ==
List of shipwrecks: 27 August 1878
Ship	State	Description
Charles Louis	United Kingdom	The ship struck a sunken wreck off the coast of Essex and was damaged. She was on a voyage from London to Goole, Yorkshire.
Furness Abbey	United Kingdom	The ship was wrecked at Tangalle, Ceylon. Her crew were rescued. She was on a voyage from Galle, Ceylon to Rangoon, Burma.
Mercur	United Kingdom	The ship was wrecked in the Faroe Islands. She was on a voyage from Liverpool, Lancashire to Iceland.
Vincente	Spain	The schooner collided with Collibu (France) at Gibraltar and was beached. Vincente was on a voyage from Mataró to a Galician port.
Queen	United Kingdom	The derelict ship foundered in the Barents Sea. She was on a voyage from Arkhangelsk, Russia to London.

== 28 August ==
List of shipwrecks: 28 August 1878
Ship	State	Description
Adele Accame	Italy	The barque ran aground on the Kugel Bakken. She was on a voyage from Rangoon, Burma to Hamburg, Germany. She was refloated and resumed her voyage.
Autocrat	United Kingdom	The barque ran aground in the Scheldt at "Sinkerlaat", near Terneuzen, Zeeland, Netherlands. She was on a voyage from Antwerp, Belgium to Great Yarmouth, Norfolk.
Black Eagle	United Kingdom	The steam yacht was run into by the tug Atlas (United Kingdom) and sank off Walney Island, Lancashire with the loss of one of the fourteen people on board. Survivors were rescued by Atlas. Black Eagle was on a voyage from Barrow-in-Furness, to Morecambe, Lancashire.
Cygnet	United Kingdom	The steamship ran aground between Maassluis and Vlaardingen, South Holland, Netherlands. She was on a voyage from Liverpool, Lancashire to Rotterdam, South Holland.
Dos Amigos	Mexico	The brigantine ran aground on the Shoebury Sand, in the Thames Estuary. She was on a voyage from Veracruz to London. She was refloated with assistance from the tug Essex (United Kingdom) and resumed her voyage.
Elaine	United Kingdom	The steamship was wrecked at Tignabruaich, Argyllshire. All on board survived. She was on a voyage from Ardrishaig, Argyllshire to Glasgow, Renfrewshire. She was refloated on 1 September with the assistance of a tug.
Pizarro	Spanish Navy	The man-of-war was driven ashore at Bermuda during a hurricane.
Who'd a Thought It	United Kingdom	The smack ran aground on Scroby Sands, Norfolk and sank. Her crew were rescued.

== 29 August ==
List of shipwrecks: 29 August 1878
Ship	State	Description
Agnes and Louisa	United Kingdom	The steamship was driven ashore at South Shields, County Durham. She was on a voyage from Portsmouth, Hampshire to South Shields.
Camogli	Italy	The barque was damaged by fire at Genoa.
Claremont	United Kingdom	The steamship struck a rock off Cape St. Vincent, Portugal. She was on a voyage from Pomaron, Portugal to Middlesbrough, Yorkshire. She put in to Cádiz, Spain in a leaky condition.
Firth of Tay	United Kingdom	The ship capsized in the Atlantic Ocean 30 nautical miles (56 km) off Ouessant, Finistère, France. She was righted and towed in to Falmouth, Cornwall by the steamship Faithful (United Kingdom).
Helena	Sweden	The schooner was driven ashore 5 nautical miles (9.3 km) north of the Heugh Lighthouse, County Durham. She was on a voyage from Sutton Bridge, Lincolnshire to Newcastle upon Tyne, Northumberland, United Kingdom. She was refloated and taken in to South Shields.

== 30 August ==
List of shipwrecks: 30 August 1878
Ship	State	Description
Albion	United Kingdom	The schooner was driven ashore at Hela, Germany. She was on a voyage from Danzig to Christiania, Norway. She was refloated and resumed her voyage.
Anny Rosette	United Kingdom	The schooner was driven ashore at Scoughall, Lothian. She was on a voyage from Hull, Yorkshire to Leith, Lothian.
Cyrenian	United Kingdom	The steamship was driven ashore on Ischia, Italy. She was on a voyage from Livorno to Naples. She was refloated and resumed her voyage.
Diligent, and Filey	United Kingdom	The steamship Diligent collided with the steamship Filey and sank off the mouth of the River Tyne. Her 24 crew were rescued by tugs. Diligent was on a voyage from Newcastle upon Tyne, Northumberland to Alexandria, Egypt. Filey was on a voyage from Newcastle upon Tyne to Venice, Italy. She was severely damaged at the bows and was assisted in to the River Tyne by three tugs.
Eudora	United Kingdom	The barque struck a rock off "Recipe" and was damagedd. She was on a voyage from London to Port Elizabeth, Cape Colony. She was refloated and towed in to Port Elizabeth the next day.
Herald	United Kingdom	The schooner was driven ashore in the Belfast Lough. She was on a voyage from Ayr to Belfast, County Antrim.
Jessy	United Kingdom	The ketch was beached at Newhaven, Sussex. Her three crew survived. She was on a voyage from London to Plymouth, Devon. She subsequently broke up.
Lake Superior	New Zealand	The schooner stranded and became a wreck at Pakiri.
Le Procès	France	The fishing smack capsized and sank off the pier at Folkestone, Kent, United Kingdom with the loss of her twelve crew.
Portland	United Kingdom	The ship ran aground at IJmuiden, North Holland, Netherlands. She was on a voyage from New Orleans, Louisiana, United States to Amsterdam, North Holland. She was refloated the next day.
Telegraph	United Kingdom	The steamship caught fire off the Poolbeg Lighthouse, County Dublin. She put in to Dublin.
Unnamed	United Kingdom	The herring boat collided with a schooner and sank.

== 31 August ==
List of shipwrecks: 31 August 1878
Ship	State	Description
Jan Friesman	Netherlands	The schooner collided with a buoy and sprang a leak. She was on a voyage from Antwerp, Belgium to Riga, Russia. She put in to Harlingen, Friesland.
Lizzie	United Kingdom	The schooner was driven ashore 2 nautical miles (3.7 km) north of Ballantrae, Ayrshire. She was on a voyage from Seville, Spaine to Irvine, Ayrshire. She was refloated and resumed her voyage.
Lizzie & Namari	United States	The schooner was lost near Matinicus Isle, Maine. Her crew were rescued.
Mary McSweeney	United Kingdom	The schooner ran aground in Morecambe Bay and was wrecked with the loss of three of her six crew. She was on a voyage from Red Bay, Newfoundland Colony to Barrow in Furness, Lancashire.
Sarah and Mary	United Kingdom	The schooner was driven ashore at Kingsdown, Kent. She was on a voyage from London to Newry, County Antrim. She was refloated and taken in to Ramsgate, Kent in a leaky condition.
Telegram	United Kingdom	The schooner collided with the steamship Don (United Kingdom) and sank off Dover, Kent. She was on a voyage from Hull, Yorkshire to Fareham, Hampshire.

== Unknown date ==
List of shipwrecks: Unknown date in August 1878
Ship	State	Description
Alice Muir	United Kingdom	The barque was severely damaged by fire at Mauritius before 26 August. She was on a voyage from Montevideo, Uruguay to Mauritius.
Alliance	United Kingdom	The ship was lost before 4 August. Her crew were rescued. She was on a voyage from Bristol, Gloucestershire to Jersey, Channel Islands.
Anne Sorine	United Kingdom	The ship was driven ashore in the Beryozovye Islands, Russia. She was on a voyage from South Shields, County Durham to Kronstadt, Russia. She was refloated with assistance from the steamship Svalen (Norway) and taken in to "Braenas".
Black Watch	United Kingdom	The barque ran aground at Yloilo, Spanish East Indies. She was on a voyage from Glasgow, Renfrewshire to Hong Kong. She was refloated and completed her voyage in a leaky condition.
Conchita M.	Spain	The ship ran aground in the Rosa Rio Channel. She was refloated and taken in to Havana, Cuba.
Eclipse	United Kingdom	The schooner was driven ashore and wrecked at Beaver Harbour, New Brunswick, Canada. She was on a voyage from Razier Bay to Queenstown, County Cork.
Ella	United Kingdom	The barque ran aground on the Cross Sands, in the North Sea off the coast of Norfolk. She was on a voyage from Montreal, Quebec, Canada to Sunderland, County Durham. She was refloated and resumed her voyage.
Emma	Germany	The barque collided with the barque Goolwa (United Kingdom) and sank. Her crew were rescued. Emma was on a voyage from Amoy, China to Hong Kong.
Eos	Germany	The brig grounded on a sandbank in the mouth of the River Thames and went to pieces. Her seven crew were rescued by the fishing boat Catherine (France.
Etta and Josie	United States	The schooner was abandoned in the Atlantic Ocean before 12 August. Her crew were rescued. She was on a voyage from New York to Rio de Janeiro, Brazil.
Florence	United States	The 245-ton whaling barque was stove and sunk by ice in the Arctic Ocean near Point Barrow, Department of Alaska.
Grace Girdler	United Kingdom	The brig was driven ashore at Musquobodoit Harbour, Nova Scotia, Canada. She was on a voyage from Musquobodoit Harbour to Queenstown. She was refloated and taken in to North Sydney, Nova Scotia for repaires. She arrived on 21 August.
Guayaquil	Ecuador	The steamship ran aground at Santa Elena.
Harmonides	France	The ship was wrecked at Digby, Nova Scotia, Canada. Her crew were rescued. She was on a voyage from Havre de Grâce, Seine-Inférieure to Saint John's, Newfoundland Colony.
Hebe	Norway	The barque was wrecked on The Wolves, in the Bay of Fundy. She was on a voyage from Antwerp, Belgium to Saint John, New Brunswick, Canada. Hebe was refloated in October and towed in to Saint John.
Hendrika	Netherlands	The galion sank after a collision with an American barque off Dover, Kent, United Kingdom with the loss of all but one of her crew.
Hilda	United Kingdom	The ship was driven ashore on "Bush Island" before 24 August. She was refloated and taken in to Shanghai, China for repairs.
Irene	United Kingdom	The ship broke her moorings during a severe north-east gale and became a total wreck at Llandudno, Caernarfonshire. Three New Brighton registered vessels were also wrecked.
Julianne	Cape Colony	The ship ran aground at Cowie before 18 August.
Kave	Russia	The barque collided with another vessel and was severely damaged. She was on a voyage from Oulu, Grand Duchy of Finland to Liverpool, Lancashire, United Kingdom. She put in to Mandal, Norway on 2 August in a waterlogged condition.
King Koffi	United Kingdom	The ship was driven ashore and wrecked in the Volta River. Her crew survived.
Louise	United Kingdom	The ship was driven ashore on the coast of Norway. She was later refloated and beached at Trondheim.
Mary Coles	United Kingdom	The brigantine ran aground on the Goodwin Sands, Kent. She was refloated and taken in to The Downs.
Moselle	France	The steamship collided with the steamship City of Waterford (United Kingdom) and sank with the loss of two of her crew. Moselle was on a voyage from Marseille, Bouches-du-Rhône to Gibraltar.
Moss	Norway	The barque was wrecked at North Cape, Prince Edward Island.
Munroe	United Kingdom	The steamship ran aground near Porto, Portugal. She was refloated on 31 August and beached for temporary repairs. She was refloated in September and sailed to Liverpool in a severely leaky condition.
Norfolk Lass	United Kingdom	The schooner was thought to be wrecked on Corton Sands, in the North Sea off the coast of Suffolk, with all hands lost. Wreckage from the ship washed up at Great Yarmouth, Norfolk.
Norsk Flag	Norway	The ship was abandoned at sea. She was on a voyage from Grimstad to Charleston, South Carolina.
North Faroe	Denmark	The smack was driven ashore on Shapinsay, Orkney Islands, United Kingdom. She was on a voyage from Copenhagen to Kirkwall, Orkney Islands.
Quebec	United Kingdom	The steamship was driven ashore. She was on a voyage from Liverpool to Quebec City. She was refloated and completed her voyage in a leaky condition.
Regina	Norway	The schooner was wrecked on Spitzbergen before 9 August. Her crew were rescued.
Regina	Portugal	The barque was abandoned in the Atlantic Ocean. All thirteen people on board were rescued by Loch Tay (United Kingdom).
Sarah	Royal Navy	The lighter sank at Woolwich, Kent when an armoured plate was dropped. She was later refloated and found to be severely damaged.
Stranger	United Kingdom	The barque was destroyed by fire at sea before 27 August. Her crew survived. She was on a voyage from London to Port Nolloth, Cape Colony.
Sooloo	United Kingdom	The barque ran aground in the Torres Strait before 12 August. She was on a voyage from Sydney, New South Wales to Surabaya, Netherlands East Indies. She was refloated and resumed her voyage.
Thorley	United Kingdom	The ship was driven ashore at Nidingen, Sweden. She was on a voyage from Skutskär, Sweden to Hartlepool, County Durham. She was refloated with assistance.
Tricolor	Sweden	The ship collided with Josephina (Sweden) and was severely damaged. She put in to Stockholm in a waterlogged condition.
