= Londesborough Arms, Market Weighton =

Pub in Market Weighton, East Riding of Yorkshire, England

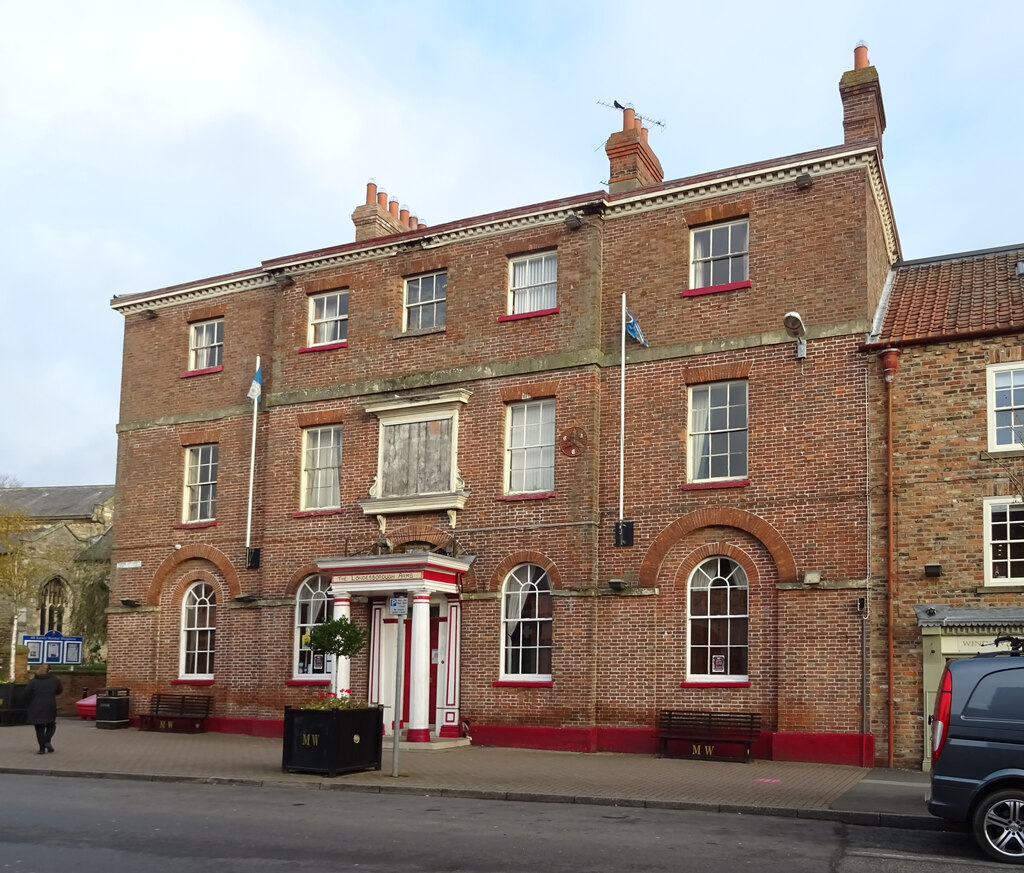
The pub, in 2021

The Londesborough Arms is a historic pub in Market Weighton, a town in the East Riding of Yorkshire, in England.

The origins of the building are disputed; Historic England describes it as having been constructed in the mid-18th century as a house, while Nikolaus Pevsner claims it was built around 1780 as a coaching inn, with funding from William Cavendish, 5th Duke of Devonshire. It was probably designed by John Carr, and is described by Nikolaus Pevsner as "Market Weighton's finest building". It was extended between 1793 and 1798, and was grade II listed in 1967.

in orange brick on a plinth, with stone dressings, a floor band, a modillion eaves cornice, and a hipped slate roof. There are three storeys and five bays, the middle three bays projecting. In the centre is a Tuscan porch, and a doorway with pilasters and panelled reveals. On the ground floor are round-headed sash windows in round-arched recesses with impost bands. Above the porch is a square panel with volutes and a cornice, on brackets, containing a coat of arms. Elsewhere, there are sash windows under flat gauged brick arches. Inside, many 18th-century features survive, including the original staircase.

== See also ==
- Listed buildings in Market Weighton
