= Vixen 101 =

Coordinates: 53.864181°N 0.665563°W

- Logo Used.

England
- Broadcast area: Market Weighton, East Riding of Yorkshire
- Frequencies: 101.8 FM, 103.1 FM

Programming
- Format: Community Radio for the West of Wolds

Ownership
- Owner: Vixen Broadcasting Ltd.

History
- First air date: 2009

Vixen 101 (or Vixen 87 as it was originally known) is a community radio station based in the town of Market Weighton, East Riding of Yorkshire, England.

The station has transmitted several Restricted Service Licence 28-day broadcasts and on 20 December 2007 was awarded a five-year community radio licence for the area. The station then began permanent broadcasting on 10 January 2009 on the frequency of 101.8 FM.

== History ==
The concept for what is now Vixen 101 originated with lifelong Market Weighton resident, Paul Stellings. By the start of 2002, Stellings had 18 years of broadcasting and management experience with Radio Medica, a local hospital radio station. This, alongside involvement with other radio projects in the area, and his work with the Giant Bradley Festival Committee in Market Weighton, led to the idea to set up a temporary radio station to promote the Giant Bradley Festival and Market Weighton's local businesses, and offer local information to benefit the wider community. Stellings had a vision to also support a wide music policy, including music from as far back as the 1940s and 1950s, together with specialist music programmes rarely catered for by other broadcasters.

At that time, Market Weighton and the surrounding villages were in the midst of a government-funded regeneration project initiated through Yorkshire Forward, and managed by the Weighton Area Regeneration Partnership (WARP). With many ideas and new projects starting to take shape in the area, it seemed like the perfect time and a major step forward in this new era for the area to bring a truly local radio service to the population.

In January 2002, Stellings commenced the setup of Vixen 87, targeting a month-long broadcast starting in May 2003. Setting up a high quality, professional-sounding radio station from scratch is complex and time-consuming task and sixteen months was calculated by Stellings as being a realistic timescale to set up the station.

After initial assistance from the Council For Voluntary Service (CVS) in Beverley, Stellings called upon some experienced colleagues from hospital radio, along with members of the local Chamber of Trade, for their collective expertise in broadcasting and operating businesses. The group formed a committee and drew up an official constitution to create the organisation Market Weighton Community Radio, which would broadcast under the call sign Vixen 87.

After over a year of working with potential grant funders, recruiting volunteers, purchasing equipment, finding premises for the station and a transmitter site, building studios, working with governing bodies and regulators (including The Radio Authority (now OFCOM), The Performing Rights Society, Phonographic Performance Ltd, The Mechanical Copyright Society, and many others) the station launched on target at 8 minutes to 7am on Sunday 4 May 2003. That time of day was chosen to coincide with the first part of the station's frequency of 87.9 FM, with a national news bulletin at 7am followed by the breakfast show at 7:03am, presented by Stellings, opening with the track "Inner Smile" by the pop group Texas.

On 20 December 2007, the station was awarded a five-year community radio licence for the area and began permanent broadcasting on 10 January 2009 on the frequency of 101.8 FM under the new call sign Vixen 101.

In May 2011, Vixen 101 presenters Bill Horncastle and Dave Henderson set a new world record by presenting a 53-hour-long radio show, beating the record set by Chris Moyles of Radio 1 by one hour.

== Presenters ==
- Adam Myers
- Andrew Swalwell
- Bill Horncastle
- Chris Render
- Dennis Hartley
- Emperor Rosko
- Eve
- Garry Fuller
- Howard Coates
- JD
- Jerry Wright
- Jonah Jones
- Julian Watson
- Mick Finlay
- Max Roberts
- Paul Black
- Paul Symonds
- Peter Fairhead
- Phil High
- Shaun Tilley
- Simon Harding
- Sophie Swalwell
- Steve Jessney
- Terry Hopkinson
