= Market Weighton Town Hall =

Municipal building in Market Weighton, East Riding of Yorkshire, England

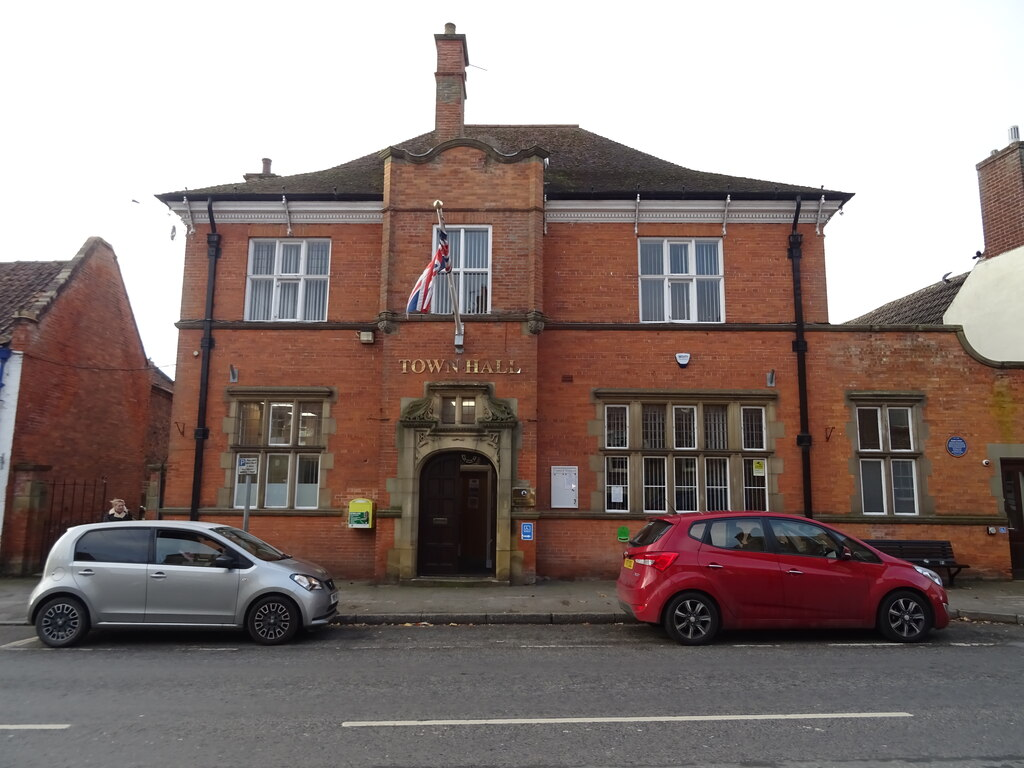
- The building in November 2021

- Shown in the East Riding of Yorkshire
- 53.8644°N 0.6665°W
- Location: High Street, Market Weighton

History
- Built: 1897

Site notes
- Architect(s): Penty & Penty
- Architectural style: English Renaissance style

Market Weighton Town Hall is a municipal building on the High Street in Market Weighton, a town in the East Riding of Yorkshire in England.

== History ==
The building was commissioned as a bank branch on behalf of the York Union Banking Company, often referred to as "the Farmers' Bank", in the late 19th century. The location they selected was on the south side of the High Street. It was designed by Penty & Penty in the English Renaissance style, constructed in red bricks with stone details and completed in 1897.

The design involved a near-symmetrical main frontage of three bays facing onto the High Street. The central bay, which was slightly projected forward, featured a segmental headed doorway with a stone surround and two small over-lights on the ground floor, a cross-window on the first floor and a section of curved coping above. The outer bays were fenestrated by mullioned and transomed windows on the ground floor and by tri-partite windows on the first floor. The building was rebranded with new signage after the York Union Banking Company was acquired by Barclays in 1902. The building continued to serve as a branch of Barclays for over a century, but in the early 21st century, it was the victim of banking consolidation, and it closed in 2014.

In 2017, Market Weighton Town Council, which was then based in a small, terraced house at No. 2 Linegate, had ambitions to acquire more substantial premises. The council called a public meeting to consider buying the former bank branch and converting it into a town hall. After the acquisition had been approved by the council, conversion work was completed in 2019, creating a council chamber, public hall, and an assortment of smaller rooms for the use of local voluntary and community groups. A lift was also installed to complement the existing staircase. The council then relocated into its new premises. In 2019, the council announced an ambition to construct a new venue at the rear, to serve as a theatre, cinema and arts centre.

On 5 June 2021, the council installed a blue plaque on the front of the building to commemorate the life of the English diarist and landowner, Anne Lister, sometimes known as "the first modern lesbian", who had been brought up in the town before moving to Shibden Hall.
