= Our Lady of Perpetual Help Church, Market Weighton =

Catholic church in the East Riding of Yorkshire, England

Coordinates: 53.8605°N 0.6611°W

The church, in 2011

Our Lady of Perpetual Help Church is a Catholic church in Market Weighton, a town in the East Riding of Yorkshire, in England.

Catholics in Market Weighton historically worshipped at the chapel at Houghton Hall. In 1905, a tin tabernacle was built in the town. In 1959, the chapel at Houghton Hall was demolished, and this led to the construction of a more substantial church in the town. It was completed in 1960, and was designed by Jack Houghton, at a cost of £13,500.

The church is built of brick, with the north and south sides having glazed upper parts, and the roof is clad in copper. In the middle of the roof is a copper "spike" taking the part of a spire. It has a cruciform plan, with a substantial nave, small sanctuary and narrow but deep recessed porch. Inside, the original pews and chandeliers survive, while the marble altar and wooden ambo are later. The wooden Stations of the Cross were brought from the old church, and the octagonal stone font may also have been relocated.
