= Listed buildings in Market Weighton =

Market Weighton is a civil parish in the county of the East Riding of Yorkshire, England. It contains 20 listed buildings that are recorded in the National Heritage List for England. Of these, one is listed at Grade I, the highest of the three grades, and the others are at Grade II, the lowest grade. The parish contains the town of Market Weighton and the surrounding countryside. Most of the listed buildings are houses, and the others include a church, shops, a hotel and public houses, farmhouses, a former chapel, a milestone and a disused canal warehouse.

== Key ==
Grade	Criteria
I	Buildings of exceptional interest, sometimes considered to be internationally important
II	Buildings of national importance and special interest

== Buildings ==
Name and location	Photograph	Date	Notes	Grade
All Saints' Church; 53.86497°N 0.66699°W		11th century	The church has been altered and extended through the centuries, especially in a restoration and alterations between 1870 and 1872. It is built in stone with freestone dressings, the upper part of the tower is in brick, and the roofs are in lead and slate. The church consists of a nave with a clerestory, north and south aisles, a south porch, a chancel with a north vestry, and a west tower embraced by the aisles. The tower has five stages, chamfered string courses, a west window, two-light bell openings in the upper two stages, clock faces, and an embattled parapet with eight crocketed pinnacles. The east window has five lights and Perpendicular tracery.	I
38 Southgate; 53.86238°N 0.66438°W	—	Mid-18th century	The house is in orange brick, with a timber eaves cornice and a pantile roof. There are two storeys and three bays. The central doorway has pilasters, a decorated rectangular fanlight and a pediment. The windows are sashes, on the ground floor under wedge lintels and on the upper floor under cambered brick heads.	II
Bay Horse Public House; 53.86481°N 0.66863°W		Mid-18th century	The public house is in rendered and colourwashed brick, and has a tile roof with a raised gable on the right. There are two storeys and three bays. On the front are two doorways with pilasters, and the windows are sashes, those on the ground floor with cambered channelled wedge lintels.	II
Londesborough Arms Hotel; 53.86465°N 0.66655°W		Mid-18th century	A house, later a hotel, in orange brick on a plinth, with stone dressings, a floor band, a modillion eaves cornice, and a hipped slate roof. There are three storeys and five bays, the middle three bays projecting. In the centre is a Tuscan porch, and a doorway with pilasters and panelled reveals. On the ground floor are round-headed sash windows in round-arched recesses with impost bands. Above the porch is a square panel with volutes and a cornice, on brackets, containing a coat of arms. Elsewhere, there are sash windows under flat gauged brick arches.	II
Building adjoining the Londesborough Arms Hotel; 53.86459°N 0.66636°W		Mid-18th century	The building to the east of the hotel is in colourwashed red brick, with a moulded timber eaves cornice and a pantile roof. There are three storeys and three bays. In the right bay is an elliptical-headed carriage entrance, and to its left is a 20th-century shopfront. The upper floors contain sash windows under cambered brick arches.	II
Half Moon Public House; 53.86447°N 0.66672°W		Mid to late 18th century	The public house is in colourwashed brick on a plinth, with some stone, and a tile roof. There are two storeys and three bays. In the centre is an elliptical-headed carriage entrance, on the right is a 19th-century shopfront, and on the left is a shop window. The upper floor contains sash windows under wedge lintels.	II
65 High Street; 53.86476°N 0.66789°W		Late 18th century	A house, later used for other purposes, in orange brick, with a timber eaves cornice, and a Roman tile roof with a coped gable on a shaped kneeler to the right. There are two storeys and five bays. In the centre is a doorway with pilasters, a panelled soffit and reveals, and a fanlight with radial glazing. This is flanked by 20th-century shopfronts, and on the upper floor are sash windows.	II
Glenfield Farmhouse; 53.86487°N 0.66471°W	—	Late 18th century	The house is in red brick, with an ornate timber modillion eaves cornice, and a pantile roof with plain close verges and shaped kneelers. There are two storeys and four bays. The doorway has pilasters and a divided fanlight, and the windows are sashes under cambered gauged brick arches.	II
Grange Manor Farmhouse; 53.86409°N 0.70407°W	—	Late 18th century	The farmhouse is in red brick, with floor bands and a pantile roof. There are two storeys and three bays, the middle bay projecting under a pediment. The central doorway has a fanlight, it is in a relieving arch, and flanked by oblong recesses. Above it is a sash window with similar recesses, and in the pediment is a blank Diocletian window on brick kneelers. The outer bays contain sash windows, the upper window on the right bay a trompe l'oeil.	II
The Manor House; 53.86525°N 0.66450°W		Late 18th century	The house is in red brick on a plinth, and has a slate roof with tumbled-in brick to the plain close verges. There are two storeys and five bays. In the centre is a Roman Doric doorway with pilasters, an entablature, a moulded surround, a fanlight in panelled reveals and a soffit. The windows are sashes under segmental brick arches.	II
Methodist Chapel; 53.86458°N 0.66817°W		1786	The former chapel is in rendered and colourwashed red brick with a hipped pantile roof. There are two storeys and fronts of three and four bays. On the entrance front is a doorway with a pointed head and a fanlight with intersecting glazing. The windows are sashes, those in the ground floor with pointed heads and intersecting glazing.	II
Tryste House; 53.86503°N 0.66445°W		1791	The house is in red brick, with a modillion eaves cornice, and a pantile roof with raised coped gables on shaped kneelers. There are two storeys and attics, five bays and a rear wing. The central doorway has panelled pilasters, fluted impost blocks, a fanlight with radial glazing in panelled reveals and a soffit, and an open pediment. This is flanked by Venetian windows, and on the upper floor are sash windows under flat gauged brick heads.	II
12–16 High Street; 53.86415°N 0.66543°W	—	Late 18th to early 19th century	A row of three shops in brown brick, with a timber eaves cornice and a pantile roof. There are two storeys and three bays. The right two shops have paired central doorways, a canted bay window to the left and a shop window to the right. The left shop has a doorway with a reeded surround and a fanlight with radial glazing, and to its left is a shopfront. The upper floor contains sash windows under cambered gauged brick arches.	II
20 and 22 High Street; 53.86420°N 0.66548°W	—	Late 18th to early 19th century	Two shops in red brick, with a pantile roof and tumbled-in brick to the raised gables. There are three storeys and three bays. On the ground floor are shopfronts, in the centre of the middle floor is a blocked opening, and elsewhere on the upper floors are sash windows with channelled wedge lintels.	II
Sunny Bank; 53.86671°N 0.66299°W	—	Late 18th to early 19th century	The house is in red brick, with a dentilled brick eaves cornice, and a pantile roof with tumbled-in brick to the gable ends. There are two storeys and three bays, and a later lower extension to the left with two storeys and one bay. The doorway in the centre of the main block has pilasters and a semicircular fanlight, and the windows are sashes. On the extension is a conservatory, a sash window above, and a hipped roof.	II
24–28 High Street; 53.86429°N 0.66565°W	—	Early 19th century	Shops and living accommodation in brown brick at the front and limestone at the rear, with a dentilled eaves cornice and a pantile roof. There are two storeys and five bays. On the ground floor is a 19th-century shopfront with a central doorway, and to its left is a doorway with pilasters and a rectangular fanlight. Further to the left is a round-headed passage entry, a shopfront and a sash window. The upper floor contains sash windows.	II
89 York Road; 53.86524°N 0.66918°W		Early 19th century	The shop is in red brick with a slate roof, three storeys and three bays. On the ground floor is a shopfront with Roman Doric pilasters and an entablature, the doorway with a rectangular fanlight, and to the right is a sash window. The middle bay of the upper floors contains blind windows, and the other windows are sashes; all the windows have wedge lintels and keystones, most with feather motifs.	II
Milestone; 53.85181°N 0.70729°W		Early 19th century	The milestone is on the northwest side of Market Weighton Road. It consists of a round-headed whitewashed slab with an attached cast iron oval panel inscribed with the distances to Selby and Market Weighton.	II
Railway Cottages; 53.86714°N 0.66744°W		Mid-19th century	A pair of houses built for railway crossing keepers. They are in brown brick with dressings in gauged red brick, deep oversailing eaves, and slate roofs. There are two storeys, two bays and flanking cross-wings. The entries are on the sides in lean-to timber porches, and the windows are sashes under slightly cambered gauged brick arches.	II
Warehouse south of River Head Farm; 53.84444°N 0.70245°W		Undated	A disused warehouse at the end of the Market Weighton Canal, it is in red brick, with dentilled eaves and a pantile roof. There are three storeys and six bays. On the ground floor are two doorways with segmental heads. The windows on the lower two floors have segmental heads, and those on the top floor have flat heads.	II
