= HMY Fairy =

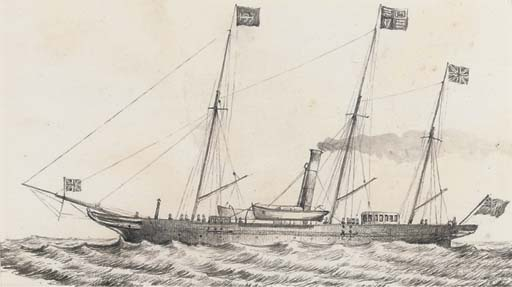
- Fairy

History

United Kingdom
- Name: HM Yacht Fairy
- Builder: Ditchburn & Mare, Leamouth, London
- Laid down: 1844
- Launched: 1845
- Commissioned: 1845
- Decommissioned: 1863
- Fate: Broken up, 1868

General characteristics
- Type: Steam yacht
- Tons burthen: 312 bm
- Length: 146 ft (45 m)
- Beam: 21 ft (6.4 m)
- Propulsion: Steam engine, single screw
- Sail plan: Full-rigged ship

HMY Fairy was a small royal yacht and tender to the HMY Victoria and Albert (1843).

== History ==
Built in 1844 by Ditchburn and Mare at Leamouth, she was commissioned in 1845.

She was 146 feet long with a beam of 21 feet and was 312 tons burden, and was able to cruise in shallow waters and as well as her duties as a tender, she sailed from London to Scotland, transported Queen Victoria up and back down the Rhine between Cologne and Bingen during her visit to Germany in 1845, and conveyed the royal family to the Isle of Wight. She was replaced by the HMY Alberta in 1863.

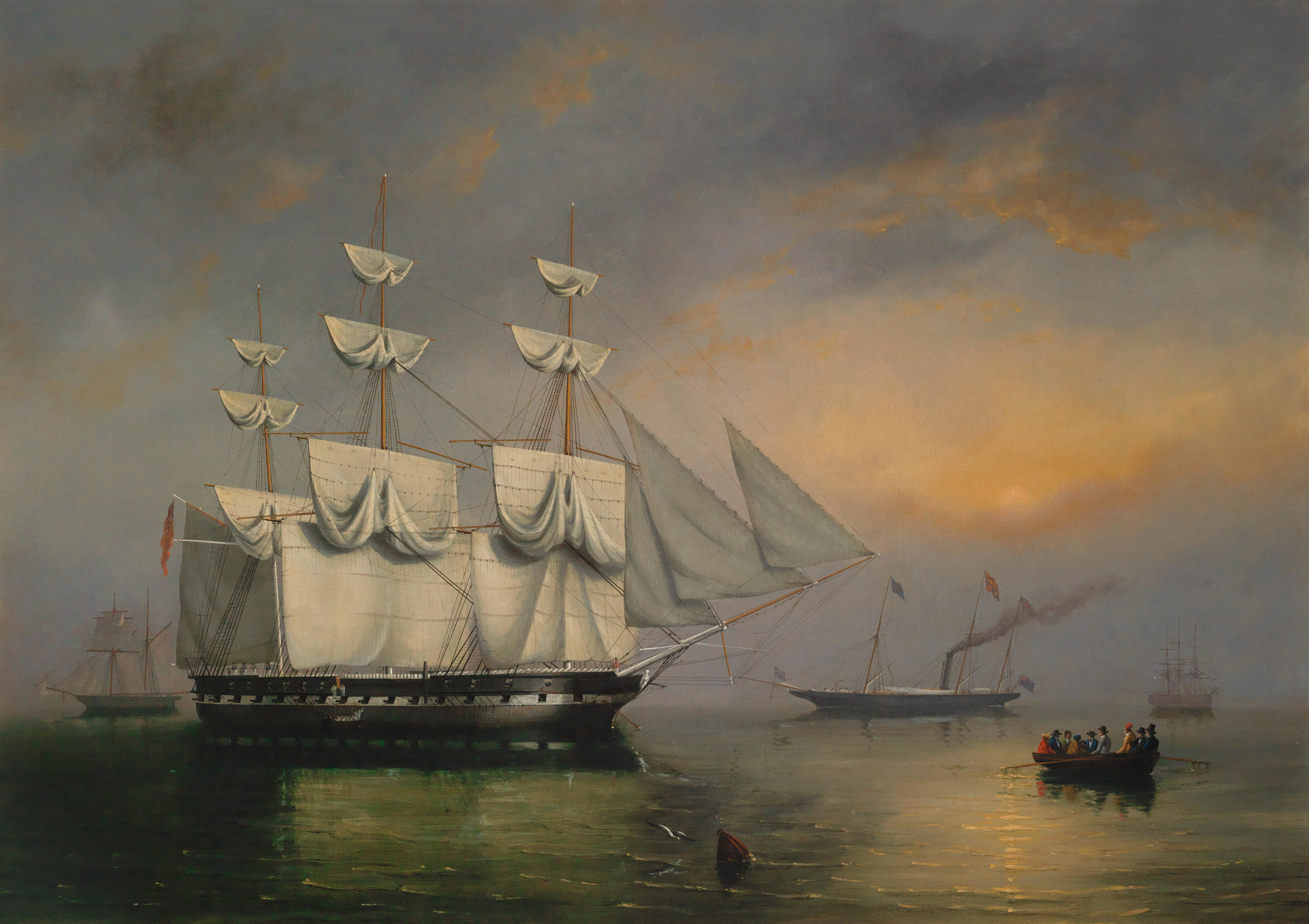
The Royal Yacht Fairy with Queen Victoria on board, making her way through ships of the fleet anchored in Spithead

== Figurehead ==
When the ship was broken up the figurehead was saved and is now part of the collection at the National Museum of the Royal Navy, Portsmouth.
