= William Umpleby Kirk =

British photographer (1843–1928)

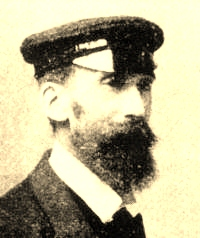
- Born: 25 March 1843; Kingston upon Hull, England
- Died: 20 January 1928 (aged 84)
- Known for: Photography
- Spouse: Ada Elizabeth Parkin d.16 May 1932
- Family: Arthur Henry b. 1866; Edgar William b. 1871; Ernest b. 1874; Oliver b. 1874; Minnie Blanche b. 1877

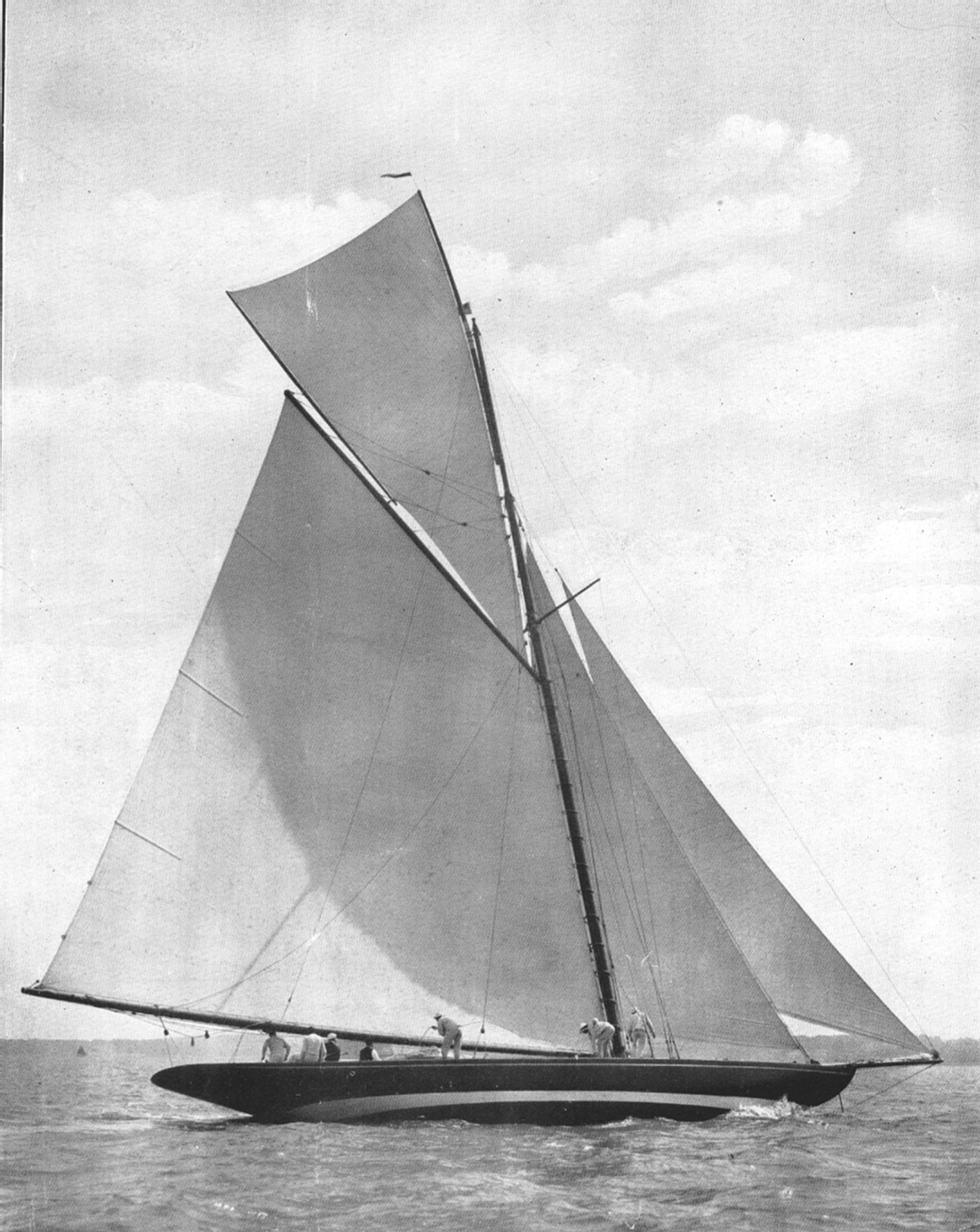
Sir Almeric Paget's yacht "Ma'oona", photographed by Kirk

William Umpleby Kirk (1843–1928) was a pioneer photographer of the late Victorian period. He was born in Hull and grew up in nearby Market Weighton where, in the early 1870s, he set up his first photographic studio. Examples of his work from that period have survived and are collected.

In 1881 Kirk moved his family and his business to Cowes, Isle of Wight, at that time the international centre of yachting. At Cowes yachts were raced, bought, sold and shown off. The rich and the titled came to Cowes to meet each other, to play and to be seen. Kirk photographed the boats and their owners afloat and ashore. He specialised in marine photographs and portraiture.

A copy of Kirk's photograph of The Marquis of Ormonde, Commodore Royal Yacht Squadron, is held in the British National Archives at Kew, and his group portrait of Sir Warden Chilcott; Rufus Isaacs, 1st Marquess of Reading; Paula Gellibrand, the Marquise de Casa Maury; George Sutherland-Leveson-Gower, 5th Duke of Sutherland; Eileen Sutherland-Leveson-Gower, Duchess of Sutherland; F. E. Smith, 1st Earl of Birkenhead; Catherine, Baroness d'Erlanger and her daughter , Baba, Baroness d'Erlanger, the Princesse de Faucigny-Lucinge is held at the National Portrait Gallery, London.

Kirk photographed groups at house parties, tutor groups and sports teams of Naval Cadets at Osborne Naval College. His photographs of the sumptuous interiors of large yachts remain to record that era.

Kirk's reputation grew when he photographed Queen Victoria's yacht HMY Alberta at a speed of 10 knots entering Cowes Harbour; this is said to be one of the first British photographs of a vessel in motion, and to have earned him the Royal Warrant. The Isle of Wight Herald (September 1881) published an article headed Instantaneous Photography

"On the occasion of the Queen's last visit to Osborne Mr W. U. Kirk, photographer, whose works, by his instantaneous method, have gaimed him considerable repute, photographed the Royal yacht Albert when steaming into the Harbour at a speed of ten knots with Her Majesty and suite aboard. The view so taken has since been exhibeted to the Queen, and her Majesty, we are glad to say, was very much pleased with it."

Photographs by Kirk of the yachts Bona and Ailsa, for example, were sold by auction at Christie's, New York and his work is sought by collectors.

A collection of Kirk's work is held by the Isle of Wight County Council and is reviewed by Ian Dear. An extensive, but as yet uncatalogued collection of Kirk's original 8" x 10" glass plates is held by the Gallery, Classic Boat Museum, East Cowes.
