= HMY Alberta =

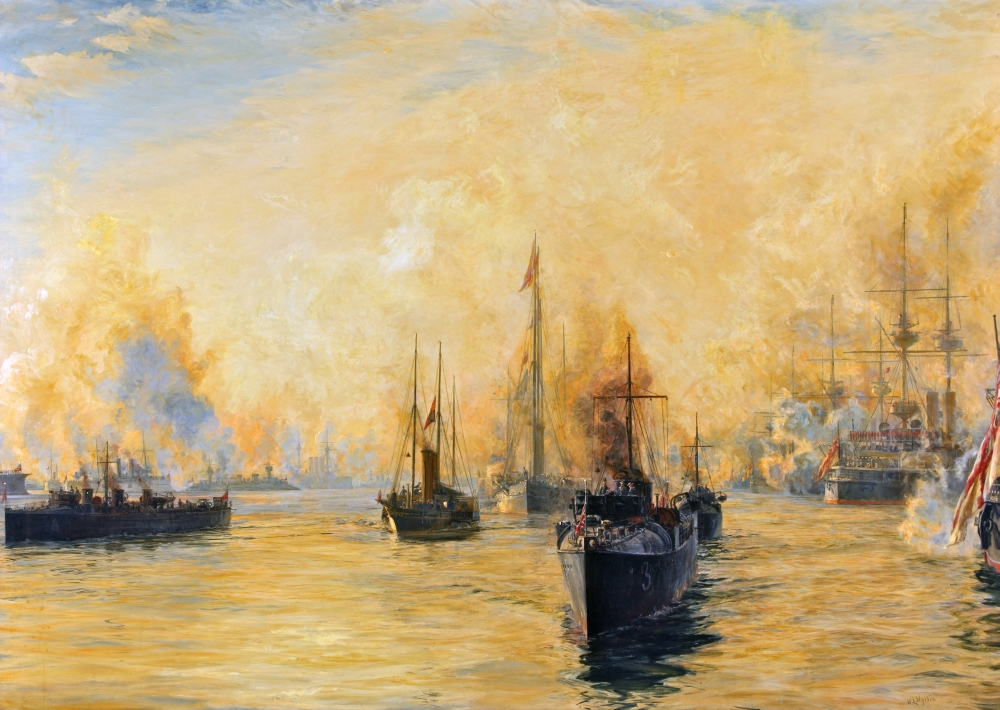
- The Passing of a Great Queen by William Lionel Wyllie, oil on canvas

History

United Kingdom
- Name: HMY Alberta
- Builder: Pembroke Dock
- Launched: 3 October 1863
- Fate: Broken up in 1913

General characteristics
- Type: Royal Yacht
- Tons burthen: 370 bm
- Length: 160 ft (49 m)
- Beam: 23 ft (7.0 m)
- Draught: 8 ft (2.4 m)
- Propulsion: Steam engines; Paddle wheels

HMY Alberta was a royal yacht of the Royal Navy of the United Kingdom. She was built by Pembroke Dock and launched in 1863.

Built as a tender to the larger royal yacht HMY Victoria and Albert, Alberta made a number of voyages carrying Queen Victoria and other members of her royal family. She was particularly used after the acquisition of Osborne House on the Isle of Wight as a summer home, and Alberta was often employed making voyages across the Solent. On one occasion, while carrying the Queen, Alberta ran down and sank a schooner, causing a number of fatalities. Alberta was used to take the Queen to engagements along the south coast of England, and in 1896 she brought the body of Prince Henry of Battenberg to the Isle of Wight for burial.

Alberta's most prominent role was in the funeral of Queen Victoria. The Queen died on the Isle of Wight after a short illness in January 1901. The Alberta carried numerous members of her family across to be present at her death bed, and it was decided that Alberta should carry the Queen's body back to the mainland. The coffin was placed aboard the yacht on 1 February 1901, and Alberta led a procession across the Solent into Gosport, receiving the salutes of the warships anchored along the voyage. After spending the night on the Alberta, the coffin was removed the next day, and taken to London for the funeral service. Alberta continued in service after this, and was eventually sold for breaking up in 1913.

== Construction ==
Alberta was launched from Pembroke Dock on 3 October 1863 as a replacement for HMY Fairy, the tender to HMY Victoria and Albert. She was a 370-ton wooden paddle steamer, 160 ft (49 m) long and with a beam of 23 ft (7.0 m), and a draught of 8 ft (2.4 m).

== Bow decoration ==
The bow decoration, carved by Frederick Dickerson of Devonport in 1863, differed from the previous Royal Yachts named Victoria and Albert which bore the royal arms of Prince Albert. However, as the prince had died before Alberta’s launch, the decoration featured a simplified form of the royal arms in oval curve form, surmounted by a crown. The decoration is surrounded by gold scrolling.

The carving can be seen on display in the Figureheads Gallery at the National Museum of the Royal Navy, Portsmouth.

== Service ==
Queen Victoria made a voyage in Alberta in August 1865, accompanied by her children, Princess Louise, Princess Helena and Princess Beatrice, and their attendants, Earl Granville, General Charles Grey, the Duchess of Roxburghe and Lady Churchill. The party embarked at Woolwich and sailed down the Thames, joining Victoria and Albert. The Queen was said to have preferred making the passage down the river in the lighter vessel. The two ships then proceeded in company to Antwerp. Alberta was also used for the journeys between the Queen's residence at Osborne House on the Isle of Wight, and the UK mainland.

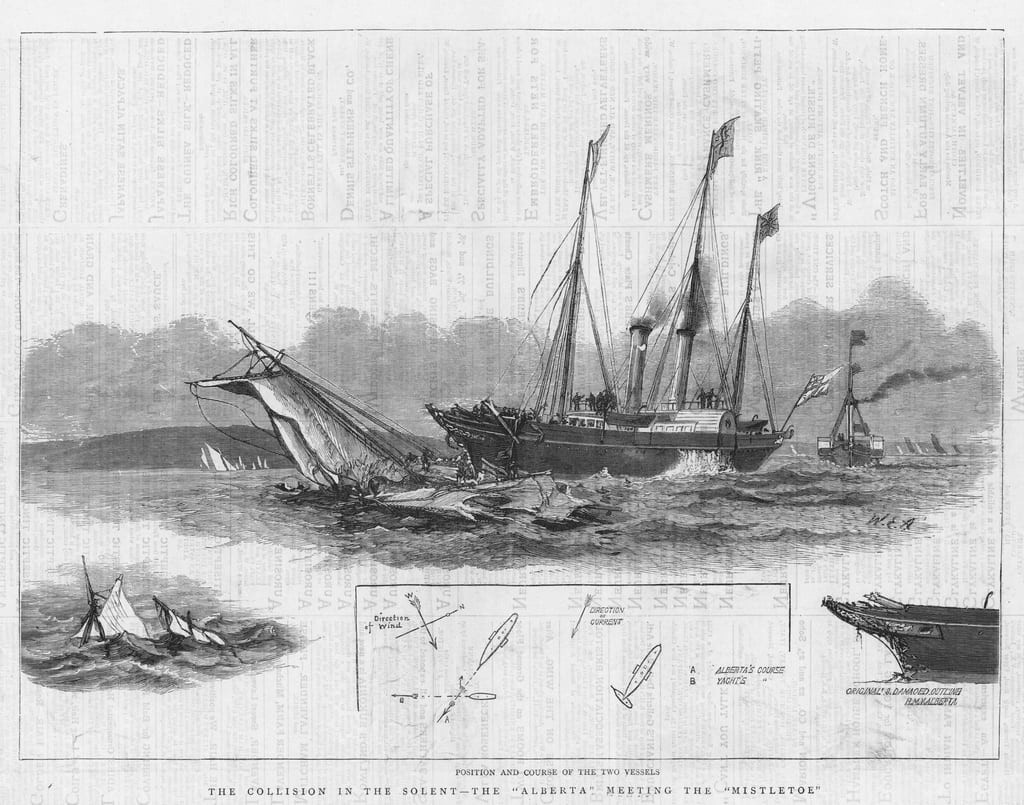
The collision in the Solent, the Alberta meeting the Mistletoe, The Graphic, 1875

While returning from Osborne with the Queen and several of the royal family aboard on 18 August 1875, the Alberta collided with the schooner Mistletoe. The captain of the Alberta altered course to pass behind of the schooner, when the Mistletoe suddenly tacked, and was run down. The survivors were pulled aboard the Alberta, Queen Victoria taking a special interest in comforting them. The master of the Mistletoe and two passengers died in the accident, and the jury in the coroner's inquest was unable to return a verdict. Alberta was found to be to blame for the collision. Captain Welch was reprimanded by the Admiralty. On 13 August 1878, she was run into by HMS Lively at West Cowes, Isle of Wight and was damaged.

William Umpleby Kirk photographed the Alberta entering Cowes Harbour at a speed of 10 knots (19 km/h; 12 mph). It was one of the first British photographs of a vessel in motion and earned him a royal warrant. Alberta was in use again in December 1882, carrying the Queen to Stokes Bay near Gosport to visit wounded personnel from the Anglo-Egyptian War being treated at Haslar Hospital. In 1896 Alberta carried the body of Prince Henry of Battenberg, who had died in West Africa of malaria during the Ashanti War, to Cowes.

== The death of Queen Victoria ==
On 18 December 1900 Alberta carried the Queen to the Isle of Wight for the last time. Aged 81, and in failing health, the Queen spent Christmas at Osborne, and her condition rapidly declined. Close members of her family were summoned, and on 19 January 1901 Alberta carried Prince Edward and Princess Louisa across the Solent to be at her bedside. Over the next few days Alberta conveyed numerous royal persons and their attendants across to the Isle of Wight, including the Prince of Wales and the Queen's grandson Kaiser Wilhelm II, on the morning of 21 January. Queen Victoria died in the evening of 22 January. After her body had been prepared, Admiral Sir John Fullerton and the officers of Alberta came ashore to pay their respects with the rest of the royal staff and servants.

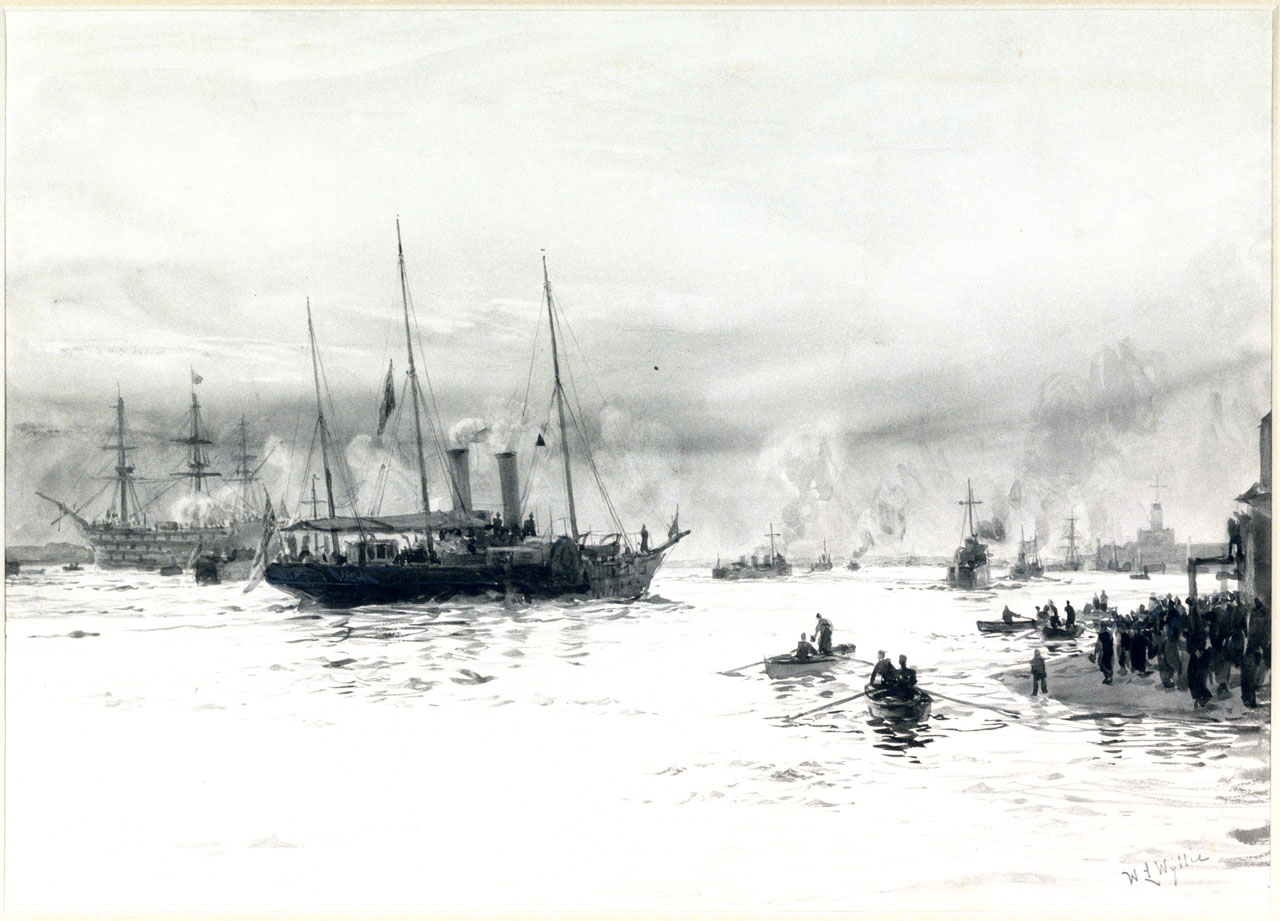
'HMY Alberta Entering Portsmouth Harbour with the Body of Queen Victoria, 1 February 1901', by William Lionel Wyllie

On 24 January Alberta carried the new King Edward VII back to Osborne after his journey to London for his proclamation as king. The Royal Standard, which had been lowered to half-mast following the Queen's death, was raised again, and the king took the salutes fired by the warships anchored in the Solent as he passed. Arrangements were made for the funeral procession and service, and it was decided that Alberta would carry the Queen's body from Cowes to Gosport, passing through a line of warships. On the afternoon of 1 February the Queen's body was brought from Osborne to Cowes, and taken on board the Alberta moored alongside Trinity Pier. Her coffin was placed on a crimson platform on the sterndeck, covered by an awning, with an officer at attention, and the Royal Standard at half-mast. The rest of the royal family, including the King, boarded the larger Victoria and Albert.

Alberta then sailed out of Cowes, escorted by a flotilla of eight destroyers, and leading the other royal yachts, the Victoria and Albert, HMY Osborne and the German yacht Hohenzollern. As they passed by the anchored warships, their crews fired salutes, bands played funeral marches, the officers saluted and the marine guards presented arms. One of the spectators, Randall Davidson, the Bishop of Winchester, remarked

the calm sea, the slow motion of the vessels, which seemed to glide without visible propelling power, the little 'Alberta' going first through the broad avenue of towering battle-ships booming out their salutes, the enormous mass of perfectly silent black-clothed crowds covering Southsea Common and the beach. I do not envy the man who could pass through such a scene dry-eyed.

It took an hour for the Alberta to cross the Solent, arriving to large silent crowds of dignitaries and spectators in the late afternoon. A battery of guns from the local garrison announced the arrival, and a marine band struck up aboard HMS Victory as the Alberta tied up at the Clarence Yard. She spent the night here, with the Queen's coffin aboard under a continuous guard of honour.

The following morning the captains of the warships which had saluted the Queen's body as the Alberta passed by, came aboard the yacht to pay their respects. The royal family attended a brief service around the coffin, read by Rev. Cosmo Lang, and then ten petty officers carried the coffin ashore and placed it aboard the funeral train that was to take it to London.

== Later service ==
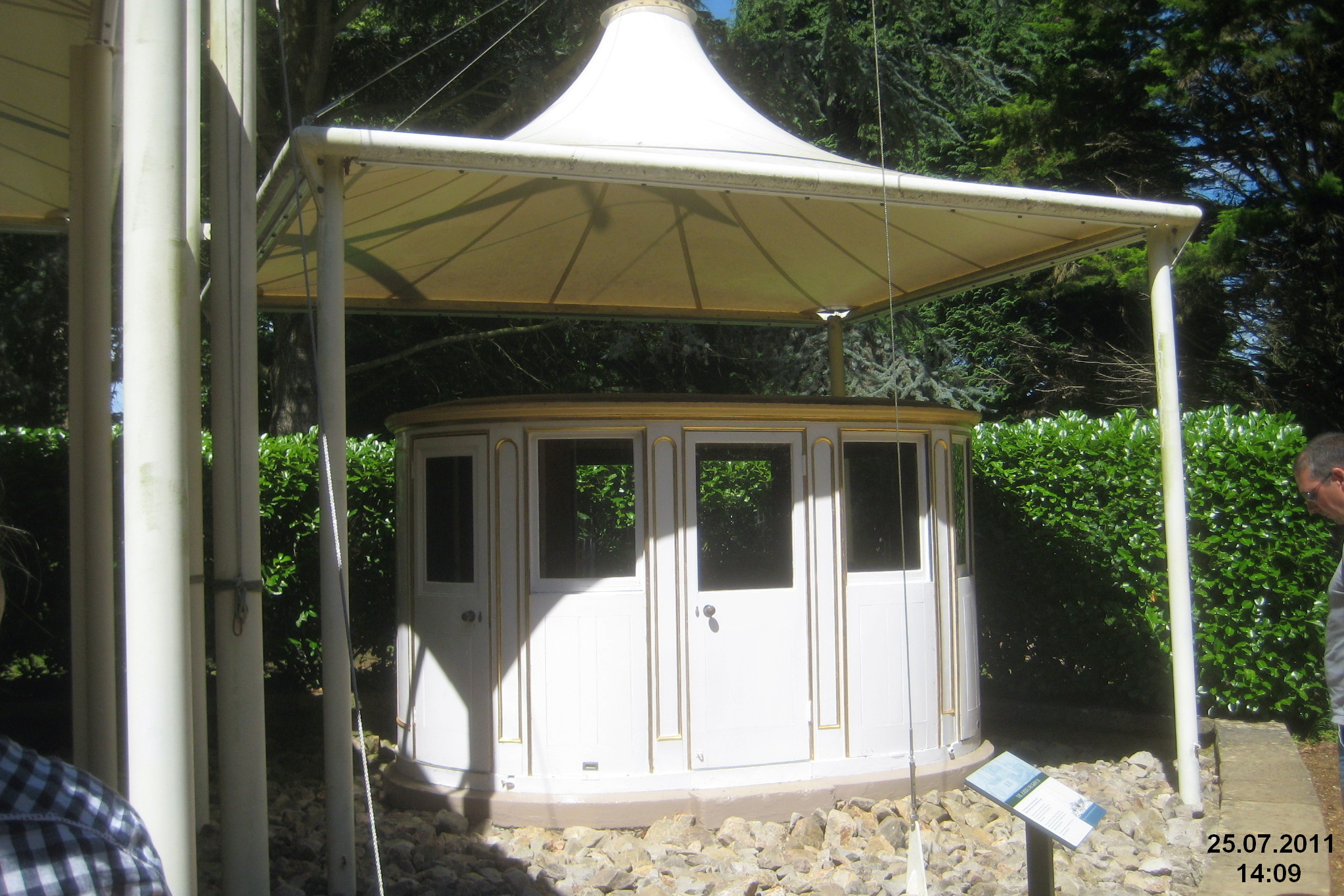
Deckhouse of the Royal Steam Yacht Alberta at Osborne House

Alberta remained in service following Queen Victoria's death, being present at King Edward VII's coronation review on 16 August 1902, with the royal yachts HMY Victoria and Albert and HMY Osborne. With the introduction of newer ships, Alberta was retired from service, and was broken up in 1913.
