= William Bradley (giant) =

Britain's tallest man (1787–1820)

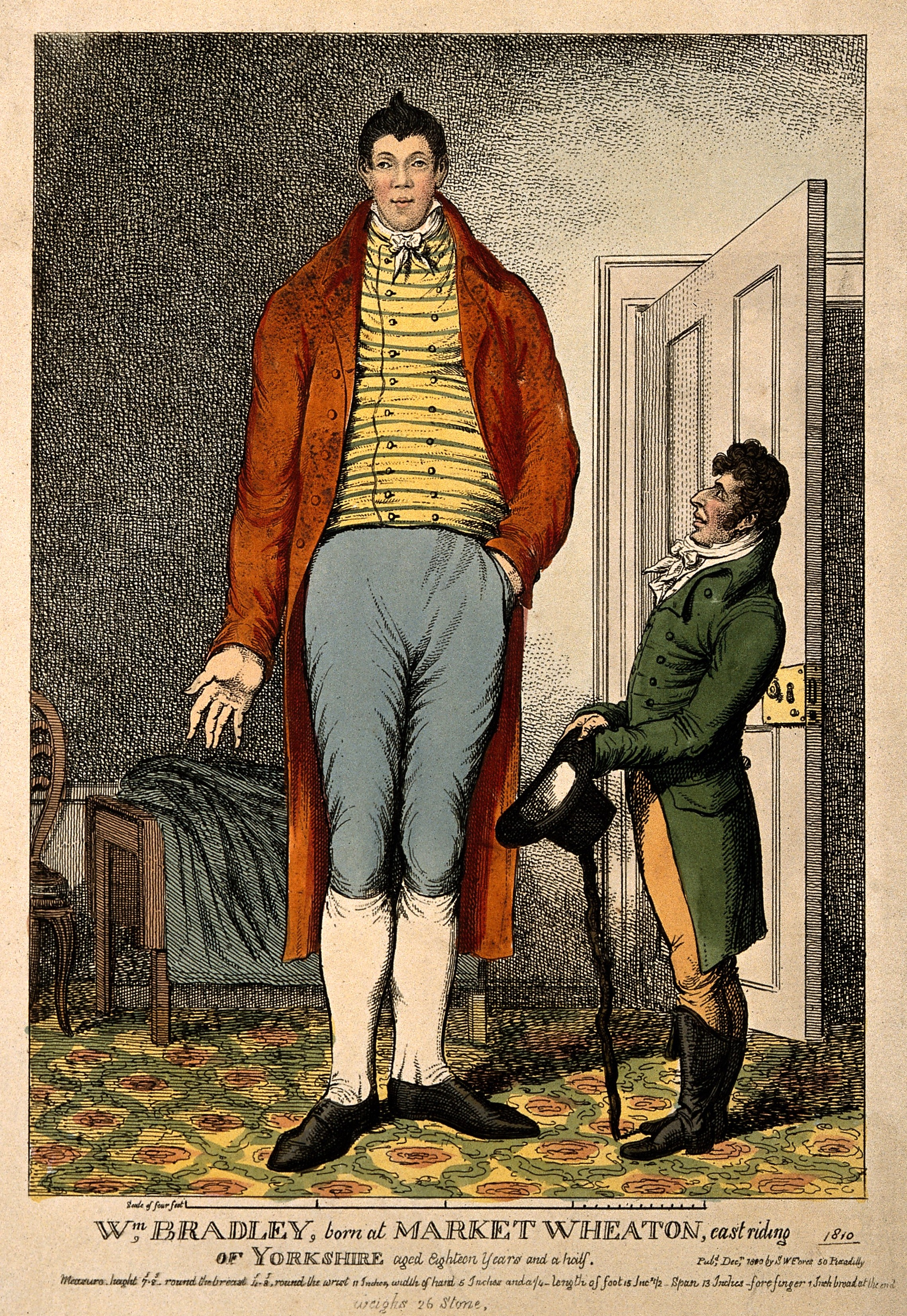
- William Bradley aged 18 and a half years
- Born: 10 February 1787; Market Weighton, East Riding of Yorkshire, England
- Died: 30 May 1820 (aged 33); Market Weighton, East Riding of Yorkshire, England
- Known for: Britain's Tallest man ever verified
- Height: 7 ft 9 in (236 cm)

William Bradley (10 February 1787 – 30 May 1820), known more commonly as Giant Bradley or the Yorkshire Giant, was a British man known as one of the tallest to ever live, measuring 7 feet 9 inches (2.36 m), the same height as Angus MacAskill from Scotland.

== Early life ==
William Bradley was born in Market Weighton, in the East Riding of Yorkshire, on 10 February 1787, the fourth of thirteen children. He weighed 6.35 kg (14.0 lb) at birth. Although Bradley would become Britain's tallest recorded man, his family was generally of average height. His father was described in later accounts as a master tailor, although the Market Weighton parish registers identify him as a butcher. He stood about 1.75 m (5 ft 9 in), while Bradley's mother, Anne, and most of his siblings were of average stature. One sister, who died in an accident at the age of 16, was also said to have been unusually tall. According to later local accounts, Bradley's father made bespoke clothing to accommodate his son's exceptional growth.

Bradley grew rapidly throughout childhood. By the age of 11, he reportedly weighed 70 kg (150 lb), and by the age of 18 he weighed 171 kg (377 lb). Later local accounts state that he required specially made shoes and, while working as a young farm labourer, specially made tools after ordinary implements proved inadequate for his size and strength.

At school, Bradley was teased because of his height, although many of his classmates were said to be frightened by his imposing stature. According to local tradition, teachers sometimes punished misbehaving pupils by having Bradley lift them onto the classroom's high crossbeams, where they remained until they were allowed down.

It is reported that Bradley enjoyed accepting wagers that demonstrated his remarkable strength. One of the best-known stories recounts that he carried a massive boulder from Goodmanham to Market Weighton after accepting a challenge. The stone, now known as the Giant's Stone, survives in the town on Londesborough Road opposite All Saints' Church, Market Weighton, where it commemorates the feat.

== Career ==
As a young man, Bradley left farm work near Pocklington, where he had earned less than ten shillings a week, and joined a travelling group of showmen. Exhibited under the name the "Yorkshire Giant", he appeared alongside other attractions, including a large Yorkshire pig bred at Sancton, about 2 miles (3.2 km) from his home town of Market Weighton.

Bradley toured fairs across England, including Hull Fair. During his exhibition career, he was presented to King George III at Windsor Castle. The King gave him a large gold watch and chain, which Bradley reportedly wore for the remainder of his life.

By 1815, aged 28, Bradley had parted from his manager and begun exhibiting himself independently. He rented rooms in the towns he visited and charged each visitor one shilling to see him.

== Death ==
Bradley died in his hometown of Market Weighton on 30 May 1820, aged 33. Fearing that his unusually large body might attract grave robbers, his family arranged for him to be buried inside All Saints' Church, Market Weighton, rather than in the churchyard.

== Commemoration ==
Bradley is commemorated in his hometown of Market Weighton by a life-sized wooden statue carved by sculptor Malcolm MacLachlan. Commissioned by Market Weighton Area Business Ltd and unveiled in May 2008, the statue stands in the town centre and honours Bradley as the tallest recorded British man.

An annual festival is organised in memory of William Bradley in his home town of Market Weighton. The event has been held annually in July since 1996 and is attended by hundreds of people in the town. It is a family-oriented event with games, amusement rides, stalls and other attractions, including the famous "Weighton Lash". Christopher Greener, who was the tallest living European for a period of time, has taken part in the celebrations in the past.

Bradley's former home on Market Hill still stands in the town. His memory is also preserved in the name of Giant Bradley Way, the section of the A1079 road that passes through Market Weighton.
