= Market Weighton =

Town in the East Riding of Yorkshire, England

Coordinates: 53°51′52″N 0°40′06″W

- Town
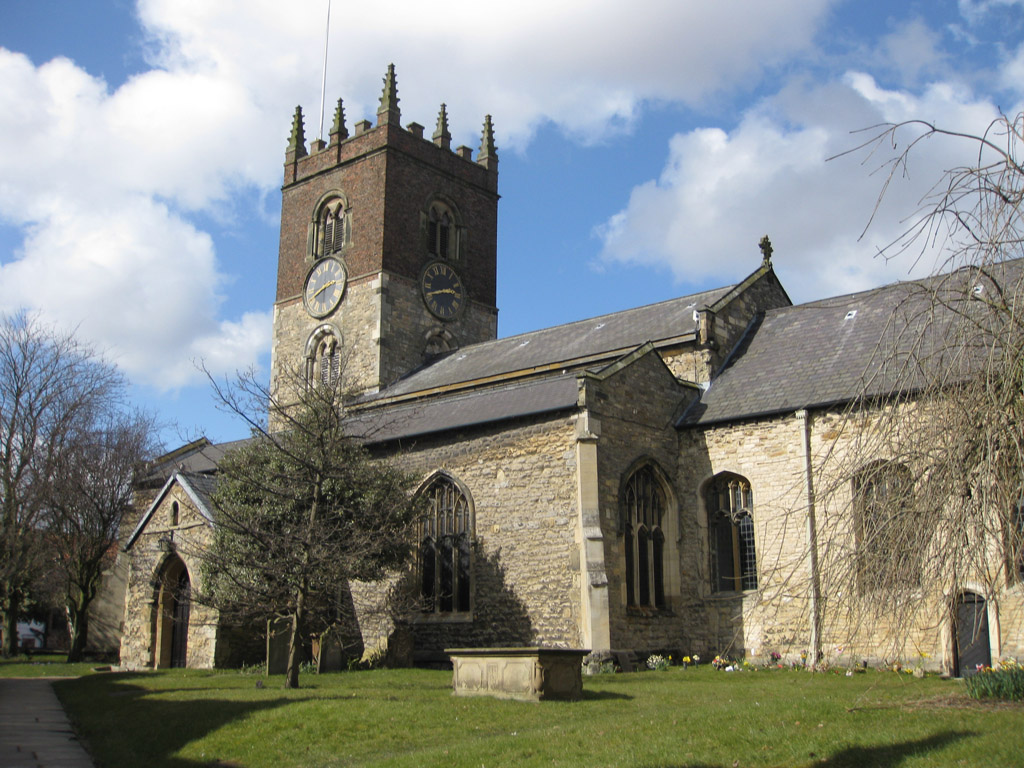
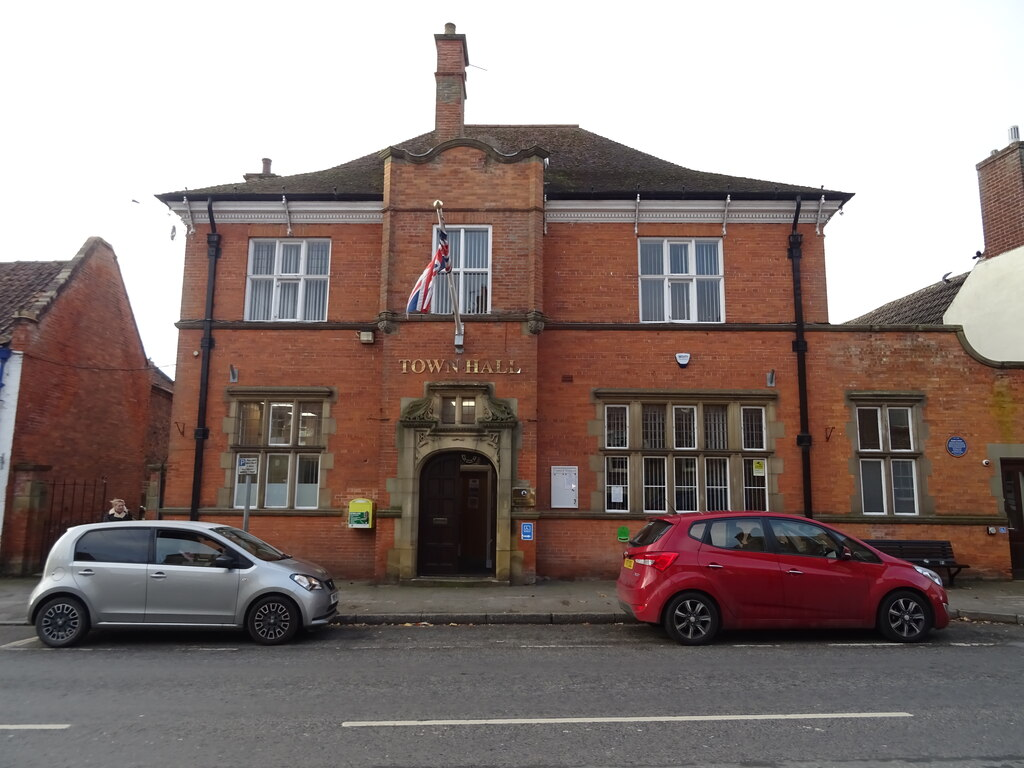
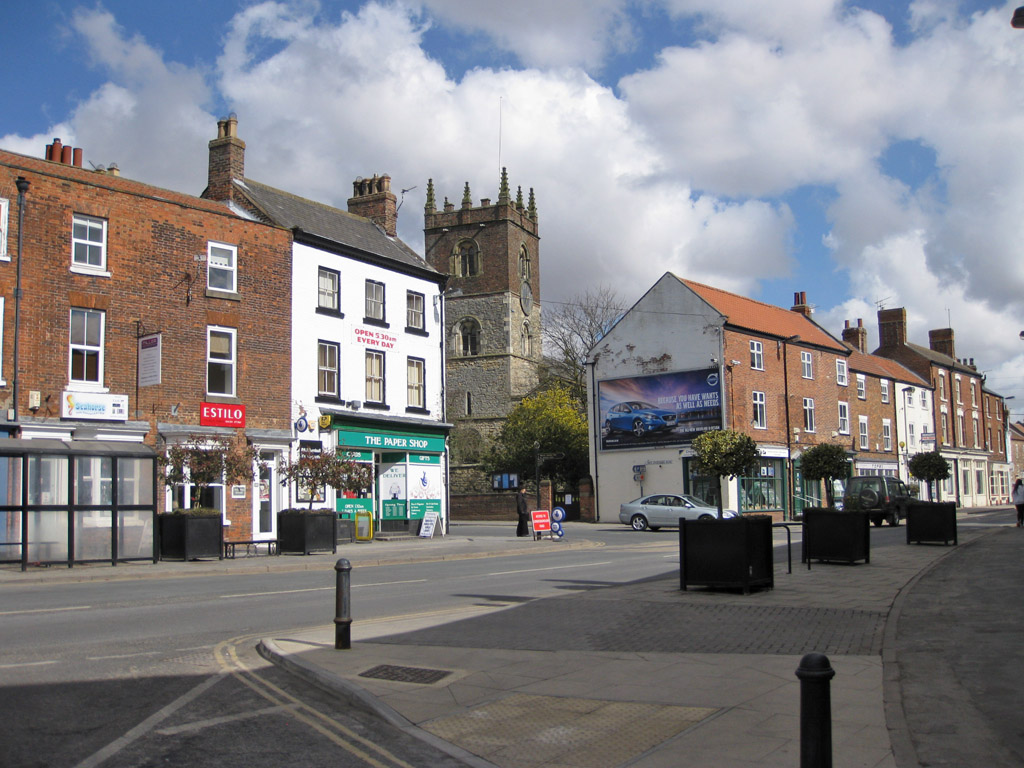
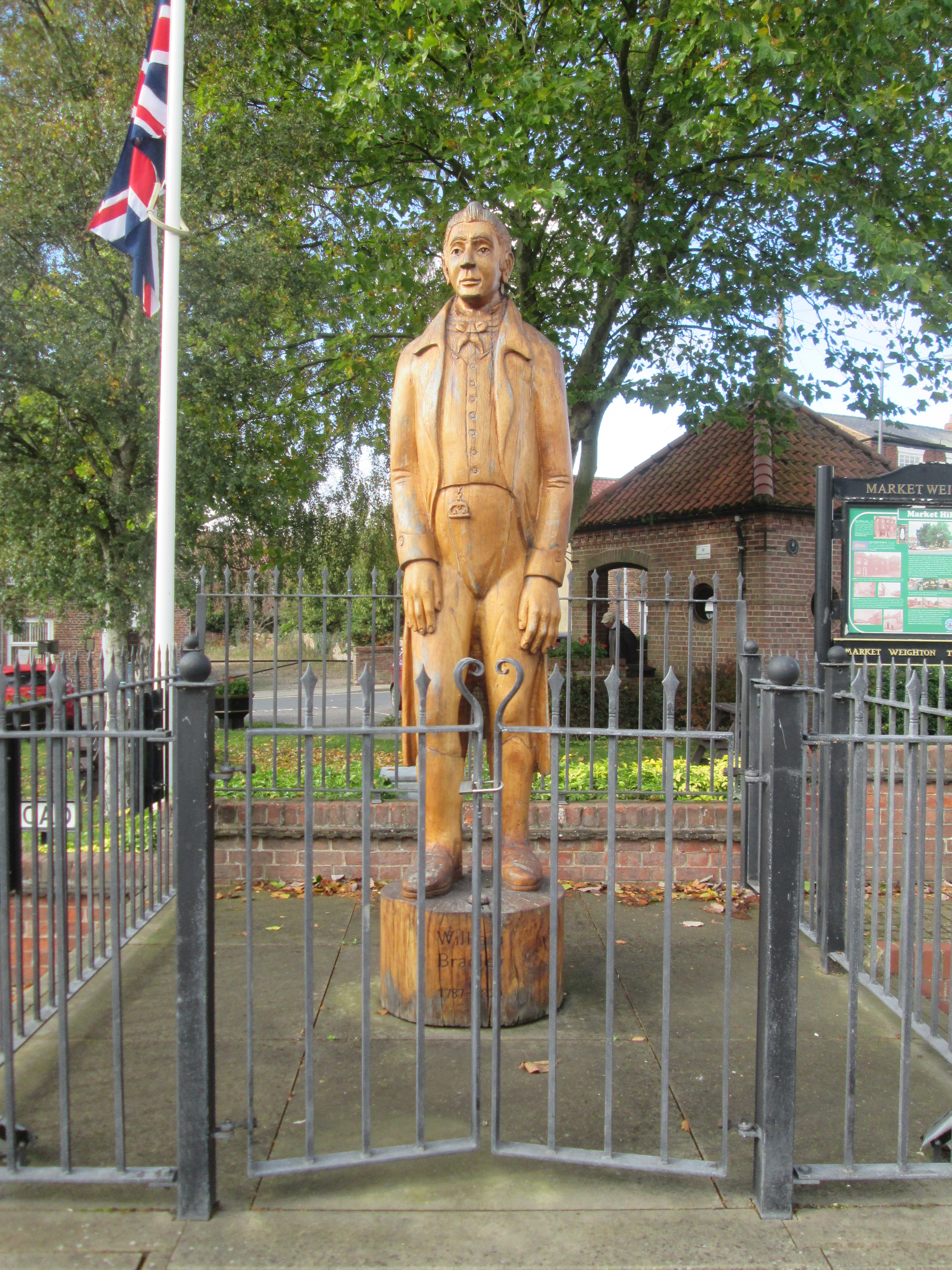
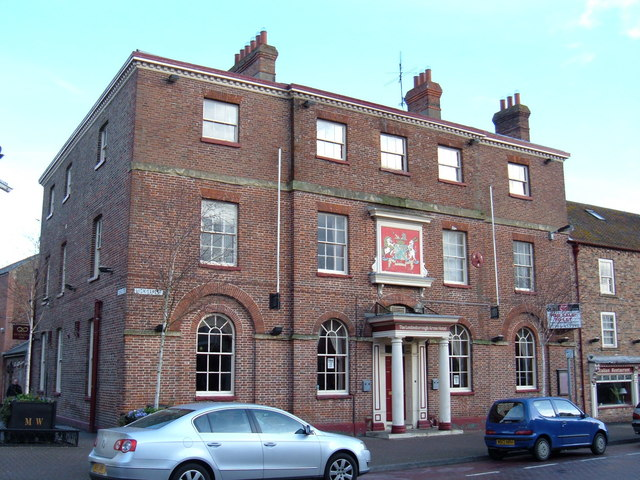
- All Saints Church The Town Hall Market Weighton Town Centre Yorkshire Giant The Londesborough

- Location within the East Riding of Yorkshire
- Population: 7,459 (2021 Census)
- OS grid reference: SE879417
- Civil parish: Market Weighton
- Unitary authority: East Riding of Yorkshire
- Ceremonial county: East Riding of Yorkshire
- Region: Yorkshire and the Humber
- Country: England
- Sovereign state: United Kingdom
- Post town: YORK
- Postcode district: YO43
- Dialling code: 01430
- Police: Humberside
- Fire: Humberside
- Ambulance: Yorkshire
- UK Parliament: Bridlington and The Wolds

Market Weighton (/ˌmɑːrkɪt ˈwiːtən/ WEE-tən) is a town and civil parish in the East Riding of Yorkshire, England. It is one of the main towns in the East Yorkshire Wolds and lies midway between Hull and York, about 20 miles (32 km) from either one. According to the 2021 UK Census Market Weighton parish had a population of 7,459, an increase on the 2011 UK census population of 6,429, which was an increase on the 2001 UK census figure of 5,212.

== History ==
The 19th-century English lexicographer Sir William Smith proposed Market Weighton as the location of the still-undiscovered Roman camp of Delgovicia. In the 16th century the antiquarian William Camden had also identified Delgovicia with this town, which he called Wighton. Historically the town was listed in the Domesday Book of 1086 as "Wicstun", and was granted its charter to become a market town in 1251; the markets ceased in the nineteenth century. Notable architecture includes: a parish church, parts of which are Norman, the Londesborough Arms (an 18th-century coaching inn), a Wesleyan chapel, a Methodist chapel and a high street still recognisable from the 19th century. Other sights of interest include the post office, the duck pond and Station Farm. Market Weighton history includes William Bradley, the Yorkshire Giant who at the age of 20 was 7 ft 9 in (2.36 m) tall. In May of each year local residents take to the streets of Market Weighton for the Giant Bradley Day (formerly Giant Community Day) festival in a celebration of the life and times of William Bradley. Industry in the town is largely based on agriculture. The town is known geologically for having given its name to the Market Weighton Axis.

The Yorkshire Wolds Way National Trail, a long-distance footpath, passes through the town.

== The Manor of Weighton ==
The history of the manor is extraordinarily complex because the Crown was long reluctant to treat grants of it as freehold. The first beneficiary was the northern baron Geoffrey fitz Pain, who was holding it when King Henry I died in 1135. He held it till 1163 when on his death it was taken back into the king's hand and entrusted to the sheriff of York who accounted for it at the exchequer. In 1177 Hugh du Puiset, bishop of Durham, secured possession of the regium manerium de Wicthtun from King Henry II to enhance the estate of the bishop's son Henry. Henry du Puiset held it uncontested until 1204, when the several heirs of Geoffrey fitz Pain of the Trussebut family began a series of lawsuits to recover it as if Geoffrey had held it in fee of the king, which it is unlikely that he did. Nonetheless by 1219 several heirs had secured shares. Until the 14th century Weighton manor was in two halves, one half initially further divided into a third share and a two-third share, each in 1276 owing the service of a single knight's fee. The senior half-share (which included a soke court) was awarded to the eldest daughter of William Trussebut, Rohese, or rather to her son, Robert II de Ros, lord of Helmsley. It stayed in the baronial family of Ros, lords of Helmsley, into the 14th century, when it was reunited with the other shares, which had been allotted to the Fitz Herbert and Daubigny families. Agnes daughter of Robert (III) de Ros married Payn de Tibetot and the manor eventually came to Thomas Broomfleet, Lord Vesci, from whom it passed to the Lords Clifford, who held it with their manor of Londesborough and the two manors followed the same succession until the modern period.

== Governance ==
Market Weighton Town Council
- Emblem

Type
- Type: Town Council

Leadership
- Mayor: Cllr Lionel Cashin
- Deputy Mayor: Cllr Diane Peaks
- Acting Town clerk: Kevin Keller

Structure
- Seats: 13 Councillors
- Independent: 12 / 13
- Yorkshire Party: 1 / 16
- Conservative: 1 / 13

Elections
- Voting system: Plurality-at-large
- Last election: 4 May 2023
- Next election: 6 May 2027

Meeting place
- Town Hall, Market Weighton

Website
- www.marketweightontowncouncil.gov.uk

As a civil parish, Market Weighton has a town council, which operates under the East Riding of Yorkshire Council. It is based at Market Weighton Town Hall, which opened in 2019.

In 2003, after some local consultation, the Weighton Area Regeneration Partnership (WARP) adopted a slogan and logo, 'The Heart of East Yorkshire', intended to indicate both its central location in the county and the strength of the local community. WARP was dissolved in 2012 but the phrase continued in use to promote the area and on local signage.

== Landmarks ==
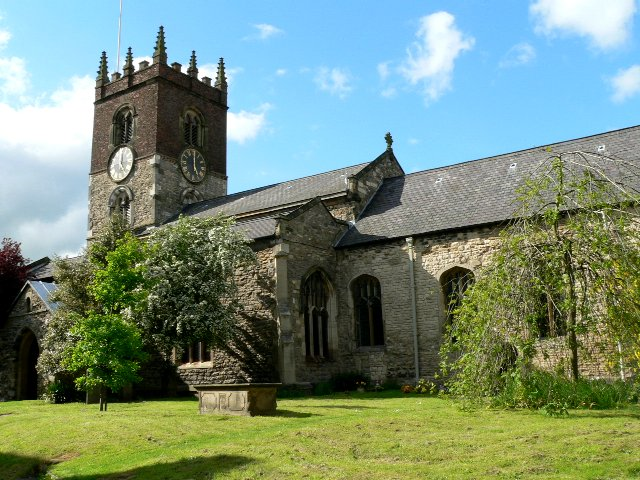
All Saints’ Church

Market Weighton has three churches. These are All Saints' Church, St John's Methodist Church and the Roman Catholic Our Lady of Perpetual Help Church. All Saints' Church, Market Weighton was designated a Grade I listed building in 1967 and is now recorded in the National Heritage List for England, maintained by Historic England.

== Transport ==
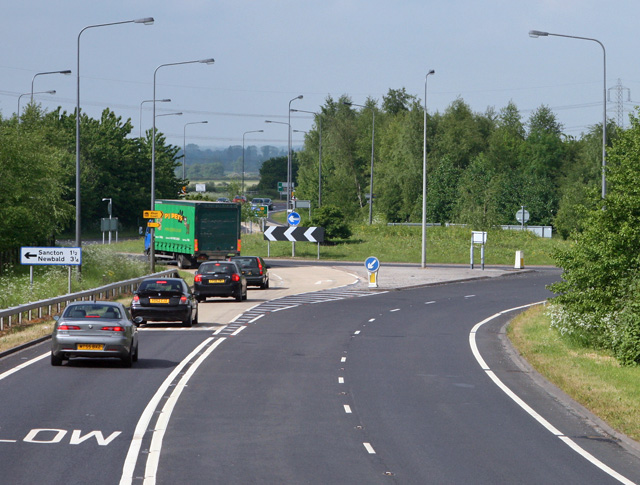
The A1079 bypass

Market Weighton railway station was at the junction of the lines to Selby, Driffield, York and Beverley. The last train ran in 1965. The abandoned lines to Beverley and to Selby are now used as public paths as the Hudson Way and Bubwith Rail Trail, respectively.

Bus services, provided by East Yorkshire Motor Services, link the town with Beverley, Hull, Pocklington, York, Holme on Spalding Moor, Driffield and Bridlington.

The three-mile £5.1 million A1079 bypass opened in March 1991.

The Minsters Rail Campaign is campaigning to re-open the railway line between Beverley and York (with stops at Stamford Bridge, Pocklington and Market Weighton). The re-opened railway would skirt the edge of the town, as the former alignment has since been built over.

== Media ==
Local news and television programmes are provided by BBC Yorkshire and ITV Yorkshire. Television signals are received from the Emley Moor TV transmitter. However, BBC East Yorkshire and Lincolnshire region is also the default BBC One variant given to Market Weighton postcodes on Channel 101 through satellite television such as Freesat.

Local radio stations are BBC Radio Humberside, Greatest Hits Radio East Yorkshire, Hits Radio East Yorkshire & North Lincolnshire, Nation Radio East Yorkshire, Capital Yorkshire and Vixen 101 is a community based radio station which broadcast to the town.

The town is served by the local newspaper, Hull Daily Mail.

== Business ==
In the 1960s and 1970s Market Weighton had a British Leyland Rolls-Royce and Bentley dealership owned by Robert B Massey and Company Ltd.

The company later merged with Gordon Armstrong and traded as Armstrong Massey in North and East Yorkshire.

== Notable people ==
- William Bradley (1787–1820), tallest ever Briton
- Jane Winifred Young Elgey née Reid (1929-2024), a child internee of the Japanese and Honorary Freewoman of Market Weighton
- Barbara Foxley (1860–1958), suffragist and professor of education
- William Umpleby Kirk (1843–1928), photographer
- Hilda Lyon (1896–1946), engineer who invented the Lyon Shape
- Sarah Andrews Miranda, wife of Venezuelan-born military leader, statesman, and the first President of an independent Venezuela, Francisco de Miranda. Although she never resided in Venezuela, Mrs. Andrews Miranda is technically considered the first First Lady of Venezuela.
- Frank Mitchell (1872–1935), cricketer

== See also ==
- Listed buildings in Market Weighton
- Market Weighton Canal
- The Market Weighton School
- Peg Fyfe, a character in Yorkshire legends said to originate from the town
