= Molesworth (surname) =

Molesworth is a surname, and may refer to:

- Caroline Molesworth (1794-1872), British botanist and meteorologist
- Carlton Molesworth (1876-1961), baseball player
- George Molesworth (1890–1968), English army officer
- Guilford Lindsey Molesworth (1828-1925), English civil engineer
- Hender Molesworth, 1st Baronet (1638–1639), Governor of Jamaica
- James Thomas Molesworth (1795–1871), English military officer and lexicographer, nephew of 6th Viscount Molesworth
- Keith Molesworth (1905-1966), American football player
- Mary Louisa Molesworth (1839–1921), English children’s writer
- Maud Margaret 'Mall' Molesworth (1894–1985) (née Mutch), Australian tennis player
- Nigel Molesworth, schoolboy protagonist of the Molesworth series of books written by Geoffrey Willans, with cartoons by Ronald Searle
- Percy B. Molesworth (1867–1908), British military officer and amateur astronomer
- Richard Molesworth, 3rd Viscount Molesworth, PC (1680–1758), British military officer
- Richard G. Molesworth (1862–1938), American politician from Maryland
- Robert Molesworth (disambiguation), several people
- Thomas C. Molesworth (1890-1977), American furniture designer
- Voltaire Molesworth (1890–1934), Australian politician
- William Molesworth (disambiguation), several people

== See also ==
- Molesworth (disambiguation)
- Viscount Molesworth, Irish title
- Molesworth-St Aubyn baronets, British title
- Molesworth of Tetcott, an English family, of Tetcott, Devon
