= Sir William Hickman, 2nd Baronet =

English politician

Sir William Hickman. 2nd Baronet DL (8 January 1629 – 10 February 1682) was an English politician who sat in the House of Commons from 1660 to 1682.

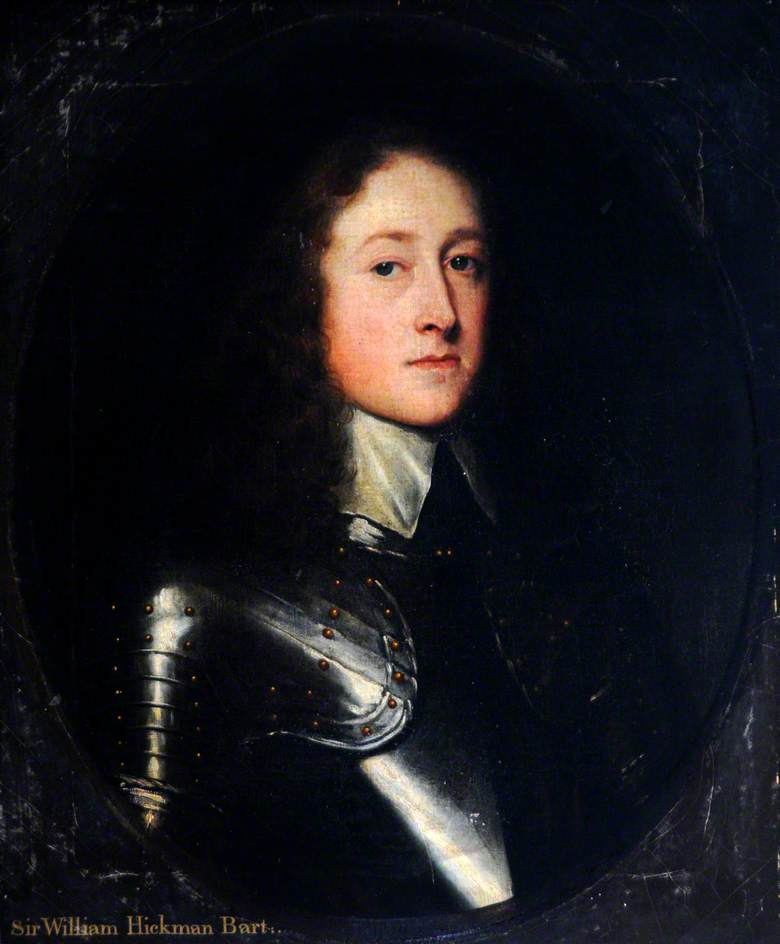
Portrait of Sir William Hickman

Hickman was the son of Sir Willoughby Hickman, 1st Baronet and his wife Bridget Thornhaugh, daughter of Sir John Thornhaugh of Fenton, Nottinghamshire. He inherited the baronetcy on the death of his father in 1649.

In 1660, Hickman was elected Member of Parliament for East Retford in the Convention Parliament. He was re-elected MP for East Retford for the Cavalier Parliament in 1661 and held his seat through successive parliaments until his death in 1682. He was a Commissioner of the Ordnance from 1679 to his death.

Hickman died in 1682 at the age of 53. He had married Elizabeth Neville, daughter of John Nevile of Mattersey Priory, Nottinghamshire. He was succeeded in the baronetcy by their son Willoughby.

Parliament of England
| Preceded by Edward Neville | Member of Parliament for East Retford; 1660–1682; With: The Earl of Kildare 1660–1661; Clifford Clifton 1661–1670; Sir Edward Dering 1670–1679; Sir Edward Nevill 1679–1682 | Succeeded by Sir Edward Nevill; John Millington |
Honorary titles
| Preceded by Sir Hardolph Wasteneys | High Sheriff of Nottinghamshire; 1653–1654 | Succeeded by John Musters |
Baronetage of England
| Preceded by Willoughby Hickman | Baronet (of Gainsborough); 1649–1682 | Succeeded by Willoughby Hickman |
