= Listed buildings in Sturton le Steeple =

Sturton le Steeple is a civil parish in the Bassetlaw District of Nottinghamshire, England. The parish contains 23 listed buildings that are recorded in the National Heritage List for England. Of these, one is listed at Grade I, the highest of the three grades, one is at Grade II*, the middle grade, and the others are at Grade II, the lowest grade. The parish contains the village of Sturton le Steeple, the smaller settlements of Fenton and Littleborough, and the surrounding countryside. Most of the listed buildings are houses, cottages and associated structures, farmhouses and farm buildings. The others include two churches, a former toll house, a former chapel, and a war memorial.

== Key ==
Grade	Criteria
I	Buildings of exceptional interest, sometimes considered to be internationally important
II*	Particularly important buildings of more than special interest
II	Buildings of national importance and special interest

== Buildings ==
Name and location	Photograph	Date	Notes	Grade
St Nicholas Church, Littleborough; 53.33408°N 0.76325°W		11th century	A small Norman church, that has been altered, particularly in 1823 when a vestry was added, and it was partly rebuilt in 1900 by C. Hodgson Fowler. It is built in stone, incorporating fragments of Roman brick, on a chamfered stone plinth, with quoins and slate roofs. The church consists of a nave, a chancel and a lean-to vestry. On the west gable of the nave is a gabled bellcote with two round-headed moulded openings. At the west end of the church is a round-headed doorway with square moulded imposts, and the windows have round moulded heads and hood moulds.	I
St Peter and St Paul's Church, Sturton-le-Steeple; 53.34589°N 0.81778°W		13th century	The church has been altered and extended through the centuries, including a restoration in 1870 by Ewan Christian, and the body of the church was largely rebuilt following a fire in 1901 by C. Hodgson Fowler. The church is built in stone with roofs of slate and lead, and consists of a nave with a clerestory, north and south aisles, a south porch, a chancel, a vestry, a south chancel chapel, and a west tower with a tower chamber. The tower has four stages, a moulded and chamfered plinth, corner buttresses, three string courses, an eaves band, eight gargoyles, an embattled parapet, and twelve crocketed pinnacles. On the south side is a doorway with a four-centred arched head, and above are lancet windows, stair lights, clock faces, and three-light bell openings.	II*
Manor Farmhouse; 53.33839°N 0.81235°W	—	17th century	The farmhouse is in colourwashed brick, with a dentilled floor band, dentilled eaves, an eaves band, and a pantile roof with tumbled coped gables and kneelers. There are two storeys and attics and an L-shaped plan, with a front range of two bays. The doorway has a fanlight and a hood on large scroll brackets. There is a three-light mullioned and transomed casement window, and most of the other windows are sashes.	II
The Manor House; 53.34671°N 0.81328°W	—	17th century	The manor house is in brick, mainly rendered, on a stone plinth, with dentilled eaves, and slate roofs with moulded coped gables, kneelers and finials. There are two storeys and attics and a T-shaped plan, with a front range of three bays. On the west front is a gabled tower porch, on the south front is a French window with a chamfered surround and an ogee head and a hood mould, and elsewhere are sash windows, some with hood moulds, casement windows, and a six-light mullioned and transomed window.	II
Four pillars, The Manor House; 53.34666°N 0.81310°W	—	17th century	The pillars are in two pairs in the grounds to the south of the house, and are in stone. The 17th-century piers are octagonal on square bases, and have domed caps and ball finials, and those dating from the 19th century have chamfered octagonal bases and ball finials.	II
Crow Tree Farmhouse; 53.35192°N 0.82445°W		Late 17th century	The farmhouse is in rendered brick, with floor bands, rebated and dentilled eaves and pantile roofs. There are two storeys and attics and an L-shaped plan, with a front fange of three bays. On the front is a Classical doorcase, a fanlight and a hood. The windows in the middle bay are round-headed sashes, and elsewhere they are casements.	II
West End Farmhouse and wash house 53.34751°N 0.82596°W	—	Mid 18th century	The farmhouse is in brick on a plinth, with a floor band and a hipped slate roof. There are two storeys and attics and an L-shaped plan, with a front range of three bays. In the angle is a Classical doorcase with a hood, and a doorway with a fanlight. Most of the windows are sashes, and there is a square-headed dormer. On the east front is a 19th-centiury wash house with a single storey and a single bay.	II
Church Farm House; 53.34644°N 0.81792°W		Late 18th century	The house is in rendered and colourwashed brick, with cogged eaves, and pantile roofs with coped gables. There are two storeys and an L-shaped plan, with a front range of three bays, and two rear wings. In the centre is a doorway, the windows on the front are horizontally-sliding sashes, and the ground floor openings have segmental heads.	II
Crown Cottage; 53.35175°N 0.81968°W		Late 18th century	A brick house on a plinth, with dentilled eaves, and a hipped pantile roof. There are two storeys and attics and an L-shaped plan, with a front range of three bays, a single-storey lean-to at the rear, and a rear wing. In the centre is a doorway with a fanlight, above it is a dummy window, and the other windows are sashes, all with segmental heads. The windows at the rear are a mix of sashes, some horizontally-sliding, and casements.	II
Wall, railing and gate, Crown Cottage; 53.35167°N 0.81971°W		Late 18th century	Enclosing the garden on the west and south sides is a dwarf wall in rendered brick and a cast iron railing. In the centre of the south side is a gate.	II
Cross Street Cottage and outhouse 53.34933°N 0.82011°W	—	Late 18th century	The cottage and outhouse are in brick with pantile roofs. The cottage has dentilled eaves and tumbled gables, and a floor band in the west gable. There are two storeys and two bays. On the front is a central doorway with a segmental head, and the windows are horizontally-sliding sashes. The outhouse to the east has a single storey and two bays.	II
Stable dated 1779, The Manor House; 53.34680°N 0.81306°W	—	1779	The stable is in brick, and has a hipped pantile roof with stone hips and the remains of a finial. There is a single storey and three bays. The stable contains a garage door and various other doorways, some with segmental heads, casement windows, blocked openings, and a stepped initialled datestone.	II
Mayflower House and outhouse 53.35155°N 0.81934°W		1794	The house and outhouse are in brick, with dentilled eaves, and a pantile roof with tumbled coped gables and kneelers. There are two storeys and attic and an L-shaped plan, with a front range of two bays, and the single-storey two-bay outbuilding at the rear. The windows are a mix of casements and horizontally-sliding sashes, some with segmental heads. On the north side, initials are spelt out in diaper brickwork.	II
Former pigeoncote and barn, Church Hill Farm; 53.34579°N 0.82079°W		Early 19th century	The former pigeoncote and barn are in brick, with a floor band, rebated eaves, and pantile roofs with tumbled coped gables. There are two storeys, the barn has three bays, and the pigeoncote has one. The barn to the north contains barn doors, a hatch with a segmental head, a casement window and vents. In the pigeoncote are two doors, one with a segmental head, a casement window and external stairs.	II
Cross Street Barn; 53.34936°N 0.82055°W		Early 19th century	The barn and adjacent stable are in brick, with dentilled eaves and pantile roofs. They are in one and two storeys and have an L-shaped plan, with fronts of three and two bays. The barn contains barn doors and flanking piers, a casement window and vents, and the stable has a blank wall to the street.	II
Ferry House; 53.33336°N 0.76267°W		Early 19th century	The house is in brick with a floor band, cogged and dentilled eaves, and a slate roof. There are two storeys and attics and an L-shaped plan, with a main range of four bays. In the centre of the east front is a timber latticed porch, and a doorway with beaded jambs and a fanlight. The windows are sashes with segmental heads, and in the attic are gabled dormers.	II
Littleborough Cottage; 53.33834°N 0.77781°W		Early 19th century	Originally a toll house, the cottage is in brick on a rendered plinth, and has a hipped glazed pantile roof. There are two storeys and three bays, and a canted front. In the centre of the front is a timber porch, and the windows are casements.	II
Former Wesleyan Chapel, wall and railing 53.35178°N 0.81951°W		1832	The chapel, later converted for residential use, is in chequered brick, with stone dressings, dentilled eaves, an eaves band, a dentilled pediment, and a pantile roof with a coped gable and kneelers. There are two storeys and a front of two bays. The front has flanking pilasters, a central doorway with a splayed lintel, flanked by sash windows with rubbed brick heads. The top floor contains two sash windows with Tudor arched heads and Gothic tracery, and in the pediment is a datestone. On the east side is a mullioned and transomed casement window. Along the front of the garden is a dwarf brick wall with stone coping, a wrought iron railing and gate.	II
Stable dated 1846, The Manor House; 53.34698°N 0.81312°W	—	1846	The stable is in brick with stone dressings, dentilled eaves and a pantile roof. There is a single storey and eight bays. On the south side is a doorway with a Tudor arch and a stone lintel, a casement window, a slatted opening with a segmental head, and three elliptical-headed openings. On the east side is corniced initialled datestone.	II
Boundary wall, St Peter and St Paul's Church, Sturton-le-Steeple; 53.34628°N 0.81786°W		19th century	The boundary wall enclosing the churchyard is in stone and is coped, and it extends for about 100 metres (330 ft). It contains a pair of cast iron octagonal gate posts, and a pair of wrought iron gates, with an overthrow and the remains of a lamp.	II
Culvert, gate and gate piers, The Manor House; 53.34640°N 0.81346°W		Mid 19th century	The culvert is flanked by dwarf brick walls with convex stone coping, leading to a pair of square brick gate piers. The gate is in decorative cast iron.	II
Culvert, wall, fence and gate, The Manor House; 53.34638°N 0.81290°W		Mid 19th century	The culvert is flanked by dwarf brick walls with chamfered stone coping, leading to a pair of square brick gate piers with convex pyramidal caps. The gate is in decorative cast iron. Beyond that, the boundary wall is in brick with flat concrete coping, and it extends for about 70 metres (230 ft).	II
War memorial 53.34597°N 0.81825°W		1923	The war memorial in the churchyard of St Peter and St Paul's Church, Sturton-le-Steeple was designed by Austin and Paley. It is in Darley Dale stone, and consists of a medieval-style shafted cross on a hexagonal plinth, on a three-stage stepped circular base. On the front of the plinth is a laurel wreath, an inscription, and the names of these lost in the two World Wars.	II
