= Robert Molesworth (disambiguation) =

Robert Molesworth, 1st Viscount Molesworth (1656–1725) was an Anglo-Irish landowner and statesman

Robert Molesworth may also refer to:

- Robert Molesworth, 5th Viscount Molesworth (1729–1813)
- Robert Molesworth (judge) (1806–1890), Irish-born Australian chief justice and solicitor-general
- Robert Molesworth, 12th Viscount Molesworth (born 1959)
