= William Molesworth =

William Molesworth may refer to:

- Sir William Molesworth, 6th Baronet (1758–1798), MP for Cornwall 1784–90
- Sir William Molesworth, 8th Baronet (1810–1855), British politician
- William Molesworth (British Army officer) (1894–1955), World War I flying ace
- William Nassau Molesworth (1816–1890), English clergyman and historian

== See also ==
- Molesworth (disambiguation)
