= Pattipola Tunnel =

Railway tunnel

- Interactive map of Pattipola Tunnel

Overview
- Official name: Tunnel No. 18
- Other name: Summit Tunnel
- Location: Pattipola, Sri Lanka
- Coordinates: 6°50′32″N 80°50′19″E
- Status: Open
- Route: Main Line

Operation
- Constructed: F. W. Faviell
- Opened: 1894
- Closed: January 1951
- Rebuilt: March 1951
- Owner: Sri Lanka Railways
- Traffic: rail

Technical
- Design engineer: Guilford Lindsey Molesworth
- Length: 321.95 m (1,056.3 ft)
- Max elevation: 1,897 m (6,224 ft)

Pattipola Railway Tunnel, or the Summit Tunnel, is the third longest and the highest railway tunnel in Sri Lanka. It is located approximately 3 km (1.9 mi) away from the Pattipola railway station, straddling the boundary of the Badulla and Nuwara Eliya Districts.

The tunnel was designed by Sir Guilford Lindsey Molesworth, the first director-general of Railways in Ceylon (1865–1871), and constructed by F. W. Faviell.

In January 1951 the concrete lining of the tunnel collapsed due to the activities of the Garret engines that were running on the Main Line at that time. Permanent repairs were completed in March 1951 by the district engineer, Priyal de Silva. In 1981 the tunnel was renovated, with the removal of the concrete arches installed in 1951.
