= Sir Hardolph Wasteneys, 4th Baronet =

Sir Hardolph Wasteneys, Bt JP DL

Member of Parliament for East Retford
- In office 1706–1708 Serving with Robert Molesworth
- Preceded by: Sir Willoughby Hickman; William Levinz
- Succeeded by: William Levinz; Thomas White

Personal details
- Born: 19 February 1674
- Died: 17 December 1742 (aged 68) Headon, Nottinghamshire
- Spouse: Judith Johnson (m. 1699; died 1727)
- Parent(s): Sir Edmund Wasteneys, 3rd Baronet; Catherine Sandys

Sir Hardolph Wasteneys, 4th Baronet JP DL (baptized 19 February 1674 – 17 December 1742) was an English landowner who sat in the House of Commons for East Retford.

== Early life ==
Wasteneys was baptized 19 February 1674. He was the son of Sir Edmund Wasteneys, 3rd Baronet (d. 1679), and Catherine Sandys, daughter and co-heiress of Col. William Sandys of Askham, Yorkshire. His younger sister was Catherine Wasteneys, who married Capt. Edward Hutchinson, parents of Catherine Hutchinson (wife of John Bury Esq. of Nottingham and Grange, and Robert Sutton Esq. of Scafton).

His paternal grandfather was John Wasteneys Esq., of Todwick, Yorkshire, younger brother of Sir Hardolph Wasteneys, 2nd Baronet (High Sheriff of Nottinghamshire), both sons of Sir Hardolph Wasteneys, 1st Baronet.

He was educated at Lincoln's Inn in 1694.

== Career ==
Upon the death of his father on 12 March 1678, four-year old Hardolph succeeded as the 4th Wasteneys Baronet, of Headon, in the County of Nottingham. The title had been created in the Baronetage of England in 1622 for his great-grandfather, who was also named Hardolph Wasteneys (who married Jane Eyre, a daughter of Sir Gervase Eyre and sister to Anthony Eyre). Part of his inheritance included an original First Folio by Shakespeare. In 1710, Sir Hardolph rebuilt the manor house at Headon into a mansion, reputedly designed by Thomas Hewet of Shireoaks Hall.

Wasteneys appointed Deputy Lieutenant of Lincolnshire in 1700. He was returned as a Member for East Retford, serving from 17 January 1706 to 1708. After a disagreement about deer with his main patron, the Duke of Newcastle, he did not stand in 1708 nor afterwards. He continued to serve as Deputy Lieutenant and a Justice of the Peace.

== Personal life ==
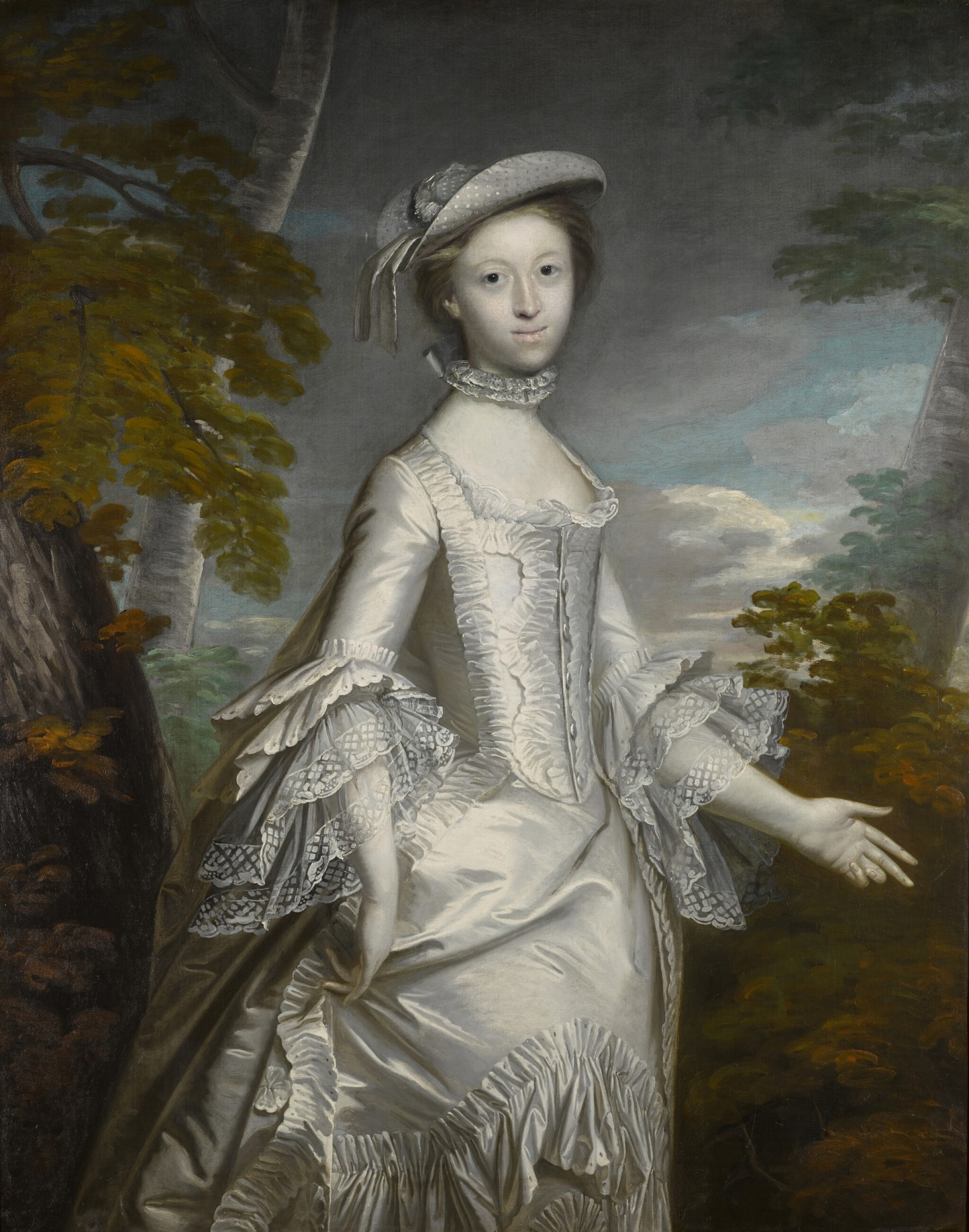
Portrait of his grand-niece, Judith Letitia Bury (wife of Anthony Eyre), by Sir Joshua Reynolds, 1755

In 1699, Wasteneys married Judith Johnson (d. 1727), daughter and heiress of Col. Richard Johnson of Bilsby, Lincolnshire, and niece of Thomas Johnson of Bilsby. They did not have any surviving children.

Wasteneys died at his Nottinghamshire seat on 17 December 1742. Upon his death, the Wasteneys line and baronetcy became extinct. In his will he left the bulk of his estate, including the Headon estate, as well as his wife's Lincolnshire property, in trust for his niece, Catherine (née Hutchinson) Bury Sutton, before it passed to his grand-niece, Judith Laetitia Bury (1731–1800), and after her marriage in 1755, to her husband Anthony Eyre of Grove Hall.

Parliament of England
Preceded by Sir Willoughby Hickman; William Levinz	Member of Parliament for East Retford; 1706–1707; With: Robert Molesworth	Succeeded by Parliament of Great Britain
Parliament of Great Britain
Preceded by Parliament of England	Member of Parliament for East Retford; 1707–1708; With: Robert Molesworth	Succeeded by William Levinz; Thomas White
Baronetage of England
Preceded by Edmund Wasteneys	Baronet (of Headon); 1678–1742	Extinct
