= Robert Molesworth, 1st Viscount Molesworth =

Anglo-Irish politician and writer

The Right Honourable Viscount Molesworth PC (Ire)
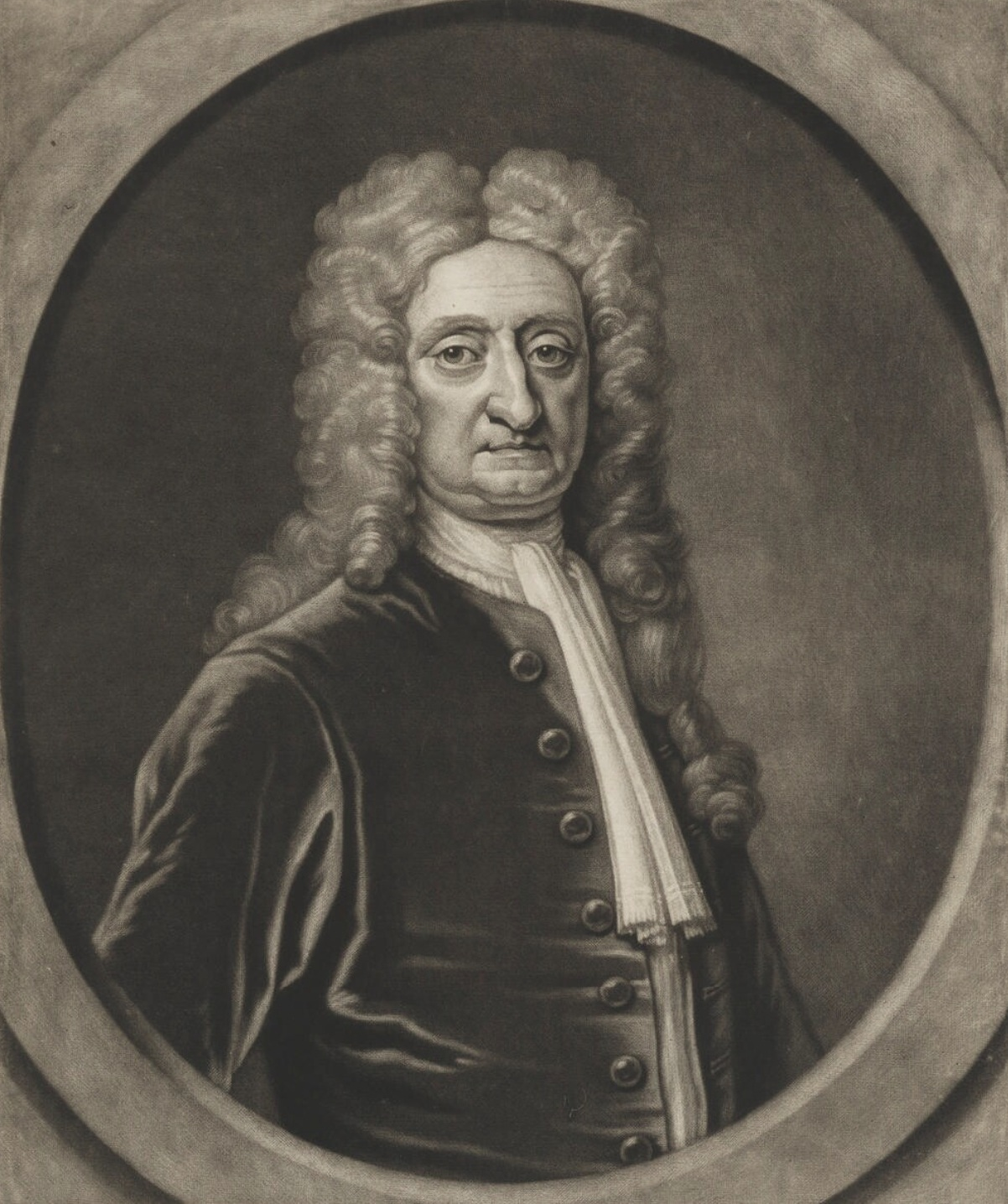
- Mezzotint by Peter Pelham after a Thomas Gibson portrait, 1721

Member of Parliament for County Dublin with Edward Deane
- In office 1695–1703
- Preceded by: John Allen; Chambre Brabazon
- Succeeded by: John Allen; Joseph Deane

Member of Parliament for Swords with James Peppard (1703–1713) Plunket Plunket (1713–1715)
- In office 1703–1715
- Preceded by: Thomas Ashe; John Reading
- Succeeded by: Richard Molesworth; Plunket Plunket

Member of Parliament for Camelford with Ambrose Manaton (1695–1696) Sidney Wortley Montagu (1696–1698)
- In office 1695–1698
- Preceded by: Ambrose Manaton; Henry Manaton
- Succeeded by: Henry Manaton; Dennys Glynn

Member of Parliament for Lostwithiel with Russell Robartes
- In office 1705–1706
- Preceded by: Sir John Molesworth; Russell Robartes
- Succeeded by: Russell Robartes; James Kendall

Member of Parliament for East Retford with Sir Hardolph Wastneys
- In office 1706–1707
- Preceded by: Sir Willoughby Hickman; William Levinz
- Succeeded by: Parliament of Great Britain

Member of Parliament for East Retford with Sir Hardolph Wastneys
- In office 1707–1708
- Preceded by: Parliament of England
- Succeeded by: William Levinz; Thomas White

Member of Parliament for Mitchell with Nathaniel Blakiston
- In office 1715–1722
- Preceded by: Sir Henry Belasyse; John Statham
- Succeeded by: Charles Selwyn; John Hedges

Personal details
- Born: 7 September 1656 Brackenstown, Swords, Ireland
- Died: 22 May 1725 (aged 68) Dublin, Ireland
- Spouse: Hon. Letitia Coote
- Children: John Molesworth, 2nd Viscount Molesworth; Richard Molesworth, 3rd Viscount Molesworth; Hon. Robert Molesworth (I); Hon. William Molesworth; Hon. Edward Molesworth; Hon. Coote Molesworth (I); Hon. Robert Molesworth (II); Hon. Hamilton Walter Molesworth; Hon. Coote Molesworth (II); Hon. Bysse Molesworth; Hon. Robert Molesworth (III); Hon. Margaret Molesworth; Hon. Mary Molesworth; Hon. Letitia Molesworth (I); Hon. Charlotte Molesworth; Hon. Letitia Molesworth (II)
- Parent(s): Robert Molesworth; Judith Bysse
- Education: Trinity College Dublin (1675, B.A.)

Robert Molesworth, 1st Viscount Molesworth, PC (Ire) (7 September 1656 – 22 May 1725) was an Anglo-Irish politician, diplomat and writer. Originating from an old Northamptonshire family, he married Letitia Coote, the daughter of Richard Coote, 1st Baron Coote and Mary St. George. Moleworth's father Robert made a fortune in Dublin largely by provisioning Oliver Cromwell's New Model Army; Molesworth supported William of Orange and was made the English ambassador to Denmark. In 1695 he became a member of the Privy Council of Ireland. The same year he stood for County Dublin in the Irish House of Commons, a seat he held until 1703. Subsequently, he represented Swords until 1715. In the following year, he was created Viscount Molesworth, of Swords, in the Peerage of Ireland.

== Life and career ==
Robert Molesworth was born on 7 September 1656, four days after the death of his father; his mother Judith Bysse later remarried Sir William Tichborne of Beaulieu. He was probably raised by his mother's family, the Bysses, at Brackenstown, near Swords, County Dublin. In 1689 he was proscribed by James II's Patriot Parliament and fled from Ireland to London. William III made him the English ambassador to Denmark partly to secure Danish mercenaries and to break Denmark's alliance with France, first in a private mission and from 1692 as envoy extraordinaire He had to leave Denmark quickly.

On his return animosity from William III meant he was unable to secure any position despite backing from influential Whig ministers. Instead he became the center of the more radical Commonwealthmen faction of the Whigs and the Earl of Shaftesbury regarded him as a mentor. He was regarded as the most quoted liberal Whig of his lifetime.

Queen Anne did make him an Irish Privy Councillor but he had to resign from that when in 1713 a convocation of the Church of Ireland recommended prosecution for "an indictable profanation of the holy scriptures", after he had quoted Scripture in the course of an insult to Church of Ireland representatives at a viceregal levée.

In 1720, Molesworth and his grandson lost a significant investment in the South Sea Bubble. In Parliament, since his colleagues suggested there was no law under which to punish the perpetrators, he called for the Commons to "upon this occasion follow the example of the ancient Romans, who, having no law against parricide, because their legislators supposed no son could be so unnaturally wicked as to embrue his hands in his father's blood, made one to punish so heinous a crime as soon as it was committed; and adjudged the guilty wretch to be thrown alive, sewn up in a sack, into the Tiber". He concluded that he would see the same punishment applied to the directors of the South Sea Company, calling them the parricides of their country.

== Works ==
Molesworth's An Account of Denmark, as it was in the Year 1692 was somewhat influential in the burgeoning field of political science in the period. He made a case for comparative political analysis, comparing the political situation of a country to the health of an individual; a disease, he reasoned, can only be diagnosed by comparing it to its instantiation in other people.

He also translated from French Franco-Gallia, which argued for an elective monarchy and that sovereignty rested in representative institutions.

Caroline Robbins in her book The Eighteenth Century Commonwealthman argues that Molesworth was the center of a group of dissident Whigs known as the Commonwealthmen.

== Family ==
With his wife Hon. Letitia Coote, Molesworth had eleven sons and six daughters:

- John Molesworth, 2nd Viscount Molesworth of Swords (4 December 1679 – 17 or 18 February 1726). Ambassador at the Courts of Tuscany and Sardinia in 1710 and 1720. He married Mary, daughter and co-heir of Thomas Middleton Esq. of Stansted Mountfitchet, Essex, by whom he had a posthumous daughter Mary, who married Frederick Gore Esq., M.P.
- Field Marshal Richard Molesworth, 3rd Viscount Molesworth of Swords (1680/1 – 12 October 1758). Aide-de-Camp to the John Churchill, 1st Duke of Marlborough at the Battle of Ramilles, where he saved the Duke's life. He later became a General and rose to Fieldmarshal.

He married firstly Jane Lucas and had three daughters:
- The Hon. Mary (wife of Robert Rochfort, 1st Earl of Belvedere).
- The Hon. Letitia (wife of Lt. Colonel James Molesworth).
- The Hon. Amelia (died unm 30 Jan 1758)
Richard married secondly Mary, daughter of Rev. William Usher, Archdeacon of Clonfert and had a son and six daughters:
- The Hon. Richard Nassau Molesworth (4th Viscount)
- The Hon. Henrietta (wife of Rt. Hon John Staples of Lissan House, County Londonderry. Their daughter Charlotte married William Lenox-Conyngham of Springhill, County Londonderry, father of Sir William Fitzwilliam Lenox-Conyngham. Another daughter Frances married Richard Ponsonby, Bishop of Derry and Raphoe).
- The Hon. Louisa (wife of William Ponsonby, 1st Baron Ponsonby, then William Fitzwilliam, 4th Earl Fitzwilliam)
- The Hon. Charlotte
- The Hon. Elizabeth (wife of James Stewart Esq. of Killymoon)
- The Hon. Mary and, who died with her mother in the fire at their London house, 6 May 1763.
- The Hon. Melosina, who died with her mother in the fire at their London house, 6 May 1763.

- The Hon. Robert Molesworth I (living in 1688)
- Captain The Hon. William Molesworth (born 1688, died 6 March 1770), MP for Philipstown. His son Robert became 6th Viscount Molesworth. Married Anne, eldest daughter of Robert Adair Esq. of Holybrook, County Wicklow.
- Major The Hon. Edward Molesworth (born c.1689, died 29 November 1768). Married firstly, in Sept 1718 Catherine Middleton, daughter of Thomas Middleton, with whom he had a son Robert. Edward married as his second wife Mary Renouard and had a son John (d.1791). John's son was the Rev. John Molesworth (d.1877), whose sons included Sir Guildford Lindsey Molesworth (d. 1925) and solicitor John Molesworth (d.1886), the grandfather of Margaret Patricia Molesworth (1904–1985) who is the grandmother of Sophie, Duchess of Edinburgh. Another son was the Rev. Rennell Molesworth (died 1906), grandfather of Lady Mogg née Cecilia Margaret Molesworth (1914-2018).
- The Hon. Coote Molesworth I (born c.1689)
- The Hon. Robert Molesworth II (born c.1692)
- The Hon. Walter Molesworth (born after 1692, between Robert II and Letitia II, died 1773). He left children.
- The Hon. Coote Molesworth II M.D. (born 1698, died 9 November 1782)
- The Hon. Bysse Molesworth (born 1700, died 1779). Married 7 Dec 1731, Elizabeth Cole, sister of John Cole, 1st Baron Mountflorence and widow of Edward Archdall Esq. of Castle Archdall, County Fermanagh.
- The Hon. Robert Molesworth III (born c.1702, died aged c.10 of smallpox)
- The Hon. Juliana Molesworth (died unmarried in 1759)
- The Hon. Margaret Molesworth (1677–1684)
- The Hon. Mary Molesworth (1682–1716), a celebrated beauty and poet. Married George Monk Esq. of Dublin.
- The Hon. Letitia Molesworth I (living in 1688)
- The Hon. Charlotte Amelia Molesworth (born c.1691). Married Capt. William Tichborne, younger son of Robert Molesworth's half brother Henry Tichborne, 1st Baron Ferrard making him her cousin on the Bysse side
- The Hon. Letitia Molesworth II (born 7 or 8 March 1697). Married Edward Bolton Esc. of Brazeel, County Dublin. In 1760, their son Robert Bolton (c.1727 - c.1798) translated the charter and statutes of Trinity College, Dublin from which he had graduated with an A.B. Through his youngest daughter Letitia the 1st Viscount is an ancestor of several notable figures, including actress Dame Judi Dench.

Robert also appears to have had a natural son:

- John Phillips of Swords (1711–1779), a surgeon, County Dublin, married to Henrietta Eccleston (b. 1715), herself a talented painter, daughter of John Eccleston of Termonfeckin, and his wife Elizabeth. John was the son of William Eccleston of Drumshallon, High Sheriff of Louth (1656–1705) and his wife, Rose Brabazon (1663-1686), daughter of Captain James Brabazon. They had a son and two daughters:
  - Brevet-Major Molesworth Phillips of Swords (1755–1832), a marine officer and adventurer who sailed to Pacific Ocean with Captain Cook. He married Susannah Elizabeth Burney (1755–1800), an English letter and journal writer, daughter of Charles Burney, a music historian by his first wife, Esther Sleepe. Molesworth thus became brother-in-law of Charles Burney, a clergyman and chaplain to George III and Fanny Burney, Madame d'Arblay, an English satirical novelist, diarist and playwright. He inherited entailed land in Swords, and from his maternal great-grandfather, William Eccleston (d. 1720), and his uncle, William Eccleston (d. 1795), he inherited the estate of Belcotton and the townland of Termonfeckin, County Louth. The couple left issue.
  - Magdalene Dorothea (1750-1824), married in June 1780 to George Kiernan of Blackhall, Dublin. They had issue.
  - Henrietta Maria Phillips (d. 15 Dec 1792), married on 26 August 1766 to Rev Walter Shirley, Rector of Loughrea, co. Galway

== Death and succession ==
The 1st Viscount died in Dublin on 22 May 1725 at the age of sixty-nine and was buried in Swords. His widow, Letitia, died "of a great cold" on Saint Patrick's Day 1729 and was buried privately in St. Audoen's Church in Dublin. Their eldest son, John, succeeded as 2nd Viscount Molesworth in 1725. John, in turn, was succeeded by his younger brother Richard a year later in 1726.

== Arms ==
Coat of arms of Robert Molesworth, 1st Viscount Molesworth
Crest A Dexter Arm embowed in armour proper holding a Cross Crosslet Or Escutcheon Gules an Escutcheon Vair within an Orle of eight Cross Crosslets Or Supporters Dexter: a Pegasus Argent wings elevated Or; Sinister: a Pegasus wings elevated Gules semée of Cross Crosslets Or Motto Vincit Amor Patriae (The love of my country prevails)

== Sources ==
- 29 Molesworth Street on turtlebunbury.com
- Heiberg, Steffen (8 December 2015). "Christian Siegfried von Plessen". Dansk Biografisk Leksikon (lex.dk) (in Danish). Den Store Danske / Gyldendal.
- Molesworth, Robert (1694). An Account of Denmark As it was in the Year 1692.
- Robbins, Caroline (1959). The Eighteenth-Century Commonwealthman: Studies in the Transmission, Development, and Circumstance of English Liberal Thought from the Restoration of Charles II until the War with the Thirteen Colonies (1961 ed.).
- Seccombe, Thomas (1894). "Molesworth, Robert" . Dictionary of National Biography. London: Smith, Elder & Co.
- Thompson, Martyn P (1976). "A Note on "Reason" and "History" in Late Seventeenth Century Political Thought". Political Theory. 4 (4): 491–504.

Parliament of Ireland
Preceded by John Allen; Chambre Brabazon	Member of Parliament for County Dublin; 1695–1703; With: Edward Deane	Succeeded by John Allen; Joseph Deane
Preceded by Thomas Ashe; John Reading	Member of Parliament for Swords; 1703–1715; With: James Peppard 1703–1713; Plunket Plunket 1713–1715	Succeeded by Richard Molesworth; Plunket Plunket
Parliament of England
Preceded by Ambrose Manaton; Henry Manaton	Member of Parliament for Camelford; 1695–1698; With: Ambrose Manaton 1695–1696; Sidney Wortley Montagu 1696–1698	Succeeded by Henry Manaton; Dennys Glynn
Preceded by Sir John Molesworth; Russell Robartes	Member of Parliament for Lostwithiel; 1705–1706; With: Russell Robartes	Succeeded by Russell Robartes; James Kendall
Preceded by Sir Willoughby Hickman; William Levinz	Member of Parliament for East Retford; 1706–1707; With: Sir Hardolph Wastneys	Succeeded by Parliament of Great Britain
Parliament of Great Britain
Preceded by Parliament of England	Member of Parliament for East Retford; 1707–1708; With: Sir Hardolph Wastneys	Succeeded by William Levinz; Thomas White
Preceded by Sir Henry Belasyse; John Statham	Member of Parliament for Mitchell; 1715–1722; With: Nathaniel Blakiston	Succeeded by Charles Selwyn; John Hedges
Peerage of Ireland
New creation	Viscount Molesworth; 1716–1725	Succeeded by John Molesworth
