= Sir Willoughby Hickman, 3rd Baronet =

British landowner and politician

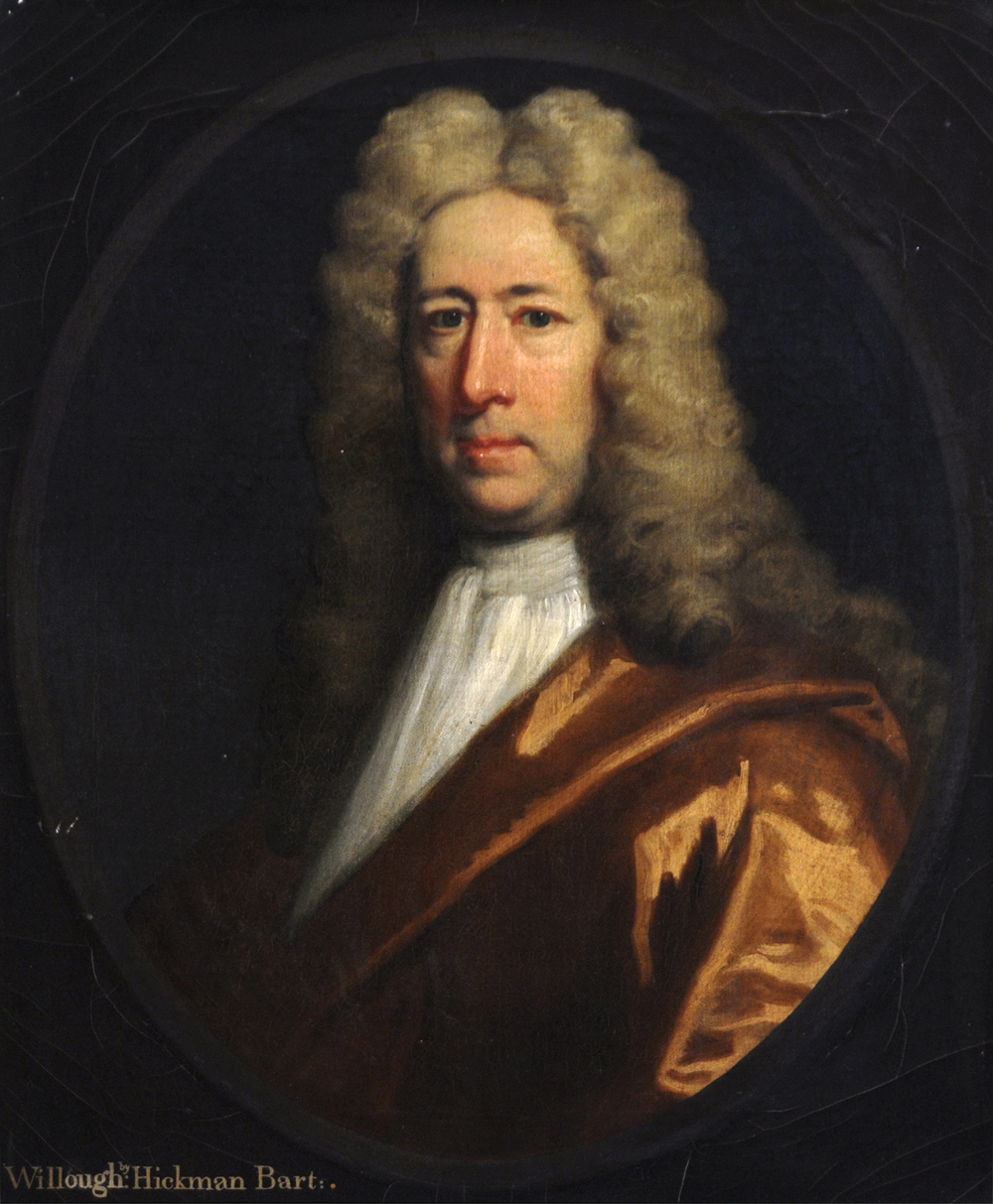
Sir Willoughby Hickman, 3rd Baronet

Sir Willoughby Hickman, 3rd Baronet (1659–1720) of Gainsborough Old Hall, Lincolnshire was a British landowner and politician who sat in the English House of Commons between 1685 and 1706 and in the British House of Commons from 1713 to 1720.

== Early life ==
Hickman was born on 20 August 1659, the third, but eldest surviving son of Sir William Hickman, 2nd Baronet of Gainsborough, Lincolnshire and his wife Elizabeth Neville, daughter of John Nevile of Mattersey Priory, Nottinghamshire. His father died in February 1682 and he succeeded to the estates and baronetcy. He married Anne Anderson, daughter of Sir Stephen Anderson, 1st Baronet, of Eyworth, Bedfordshire on 11 September 1683.

== Political career ==
Hickman was Steward of Kirton manor, Lincolnshire from 1682 to 1689. He was Deputy Lieutenant for Nottinghamshire and Lincolnshire from 1682. At the 1685 general election he was elected Member of Parliament for Kingston upon Hull and sat for two years. He did not stand again for Parliament for over ten years. He was Justice of the Peace for Nottinghamshire and Lindsey Lincolnshire from 1698 and was Commissioner for assessment for Lincolnshire in 1689 and 1690.

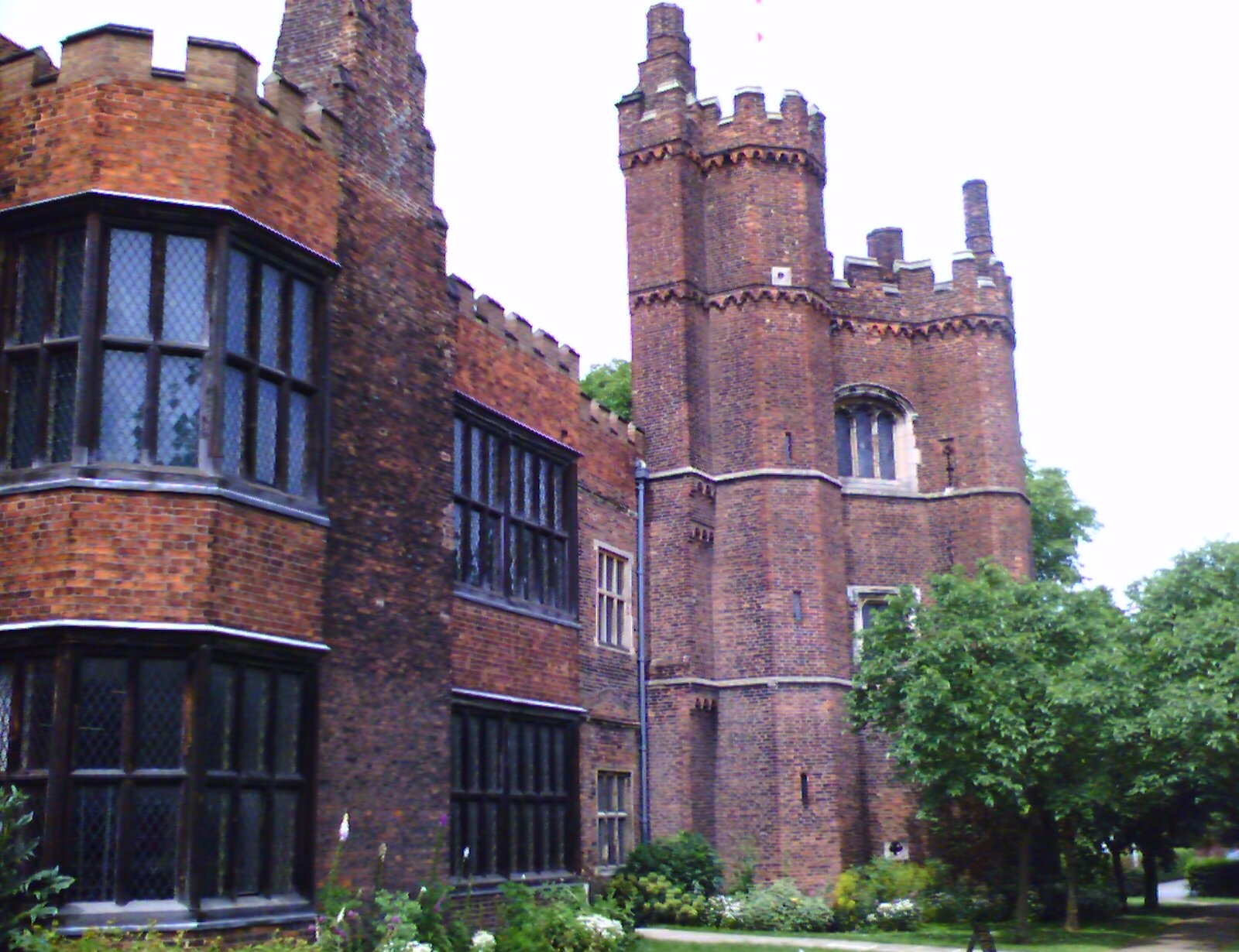
Gainsborough Old Hall

At the 1698 general election Hickman was returned unopposed as Tory MP for East Retford on his own interest which derived from the estate of Mattersey, which he inherited from his mother. Thereafter Hickman faced a contest at each election at East Retford and the result was each time overturned on petition. At the first general election of 1701 he was defeated in the poll but was seated on petition on 15 April 1701. At the second general election of 1701 he was again defeated in the poll, but this time his petition was unsuccessful. At the 1702 general election he was again defeated in the poll and returned on petition on 28 November 1702. He topped the poll at the 1705 general election, but was this time he was unseated on petition on 17 January 1706. Hickman abandoned East Retford, but at the 1710 general election returned his son Willoughby there who suffered the same experience, being returned only on petition.

Hickman was returned as MP for Lincolnshire unopposed at a by-election on 9 September 1713 At the 1715 general election, he was returned for Lincolnshire unopposed and sat until his death in 1720.

== Death and legacy ==
Hickman died on 28 October 1720. He and his wife Anne had six daughters and five sons of whom two survived. He was succeeded in the baronetcy by his son Neville.

His daughter Elizabeth, b. 1693, married Henry Eyre of Row Tor, Derbyshire (bpt 22.09.1693) and their daughter, Anne, b. c 1717-22.05.1805, married Clotworthy Skeffington, 1st Earl of Massereene on 25 Nov 1741.

Parliament of England
| Preceded by Sir Michael Warton; William Gee | Member of Parliament for Kingston upon Hull; 1685–1687; With: John Ramsden | Succeeded by John Ramsden; William Gee |
| Preceded by Richard Taylor; John Thornhagh | Member of Parliament for East Retford; 1698– 1701; With: John Thornhagh | Succeeded by Thomas White; John Thornhagh |
| Preceded by Thomas White; John Thornhagh | Member of Parliament for East Retford; 1701; With: John Thornhagh | Succeeded by Thomas White; John Thornhagh |
| Preceded by Thomas White; John Thornhagh | Member of Parliament for East Retford; 1702–1706; With: William Levinz | Succeeded by Sir Hardolph Wastneys; Robert Molesworth |
Parliament of Great Britain
| Preceded by Lewis Dymoke; Peregrine Bertie, Baron Willoughby de Eresby | Member of Parliament for Lincolnshire; 1713–1720; With: Peregrine Bertie, Baron Willoughby de Eresby 1713-1715; John Brownlow 1715-1720 | Succeeded by William Massingberd; John Brownlow |
Baronetage of England
| Preceded by Sir William Hickman, 2nd Baronet | Baronet (of Gainsborough); 1682-1720 | Succeeded by Sir Nevile Hickman, 4th Baronet |
