= Pattipola =

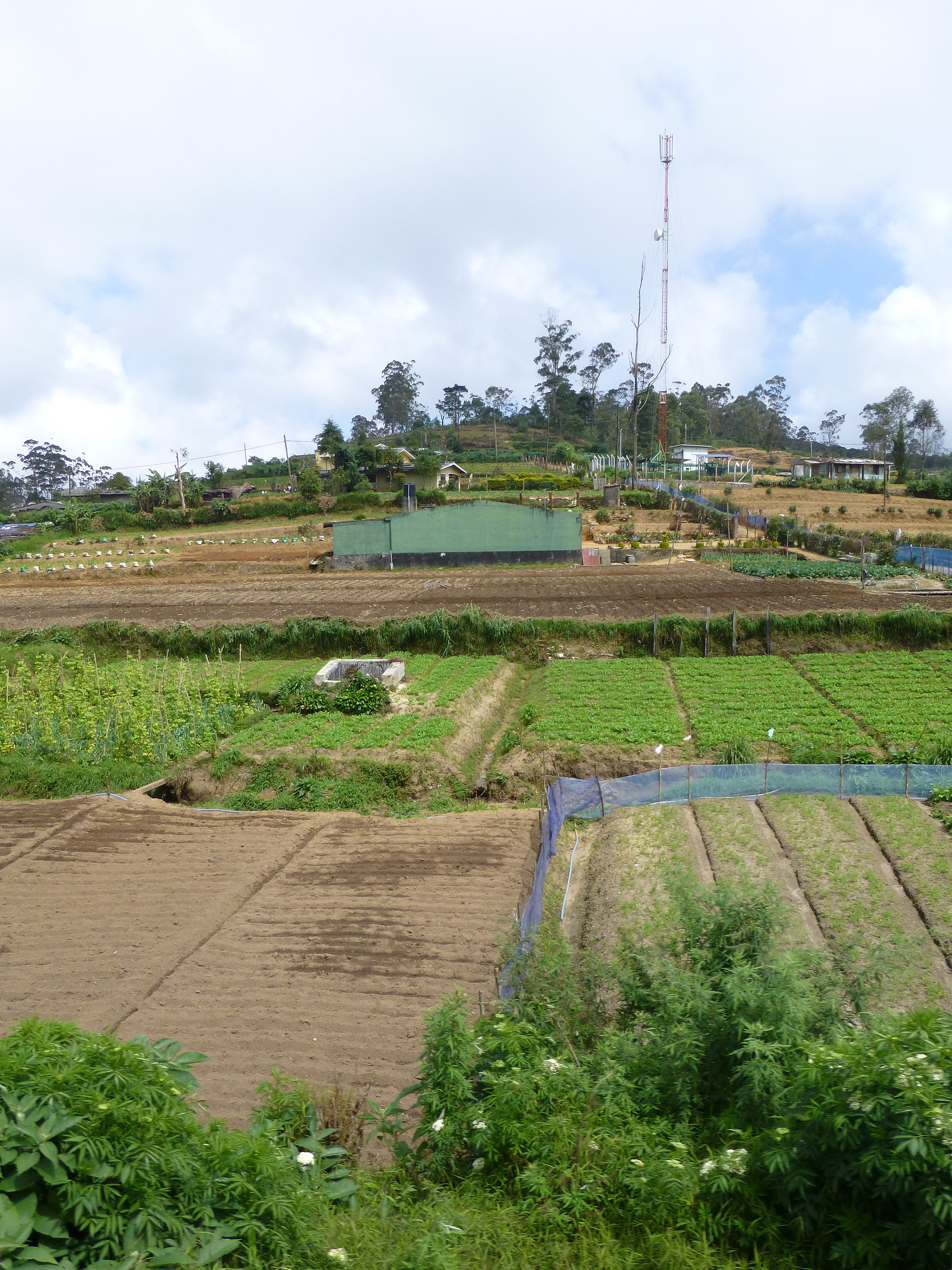

- Map of Sri Lanka showing the location of Pattipola
- Coordinates: 6.8585°N 80.8309°E
- Country: Sri Lanka
- Province: Uva Province; Central Province
- District: Badulla; Nuwara Eliya

Population (2015)
  - Total: 1,990
- Time zone: UTC+5:30 (Sri Lanka Standard Time Zone)
  - Summer (DST): UTC+6 (Summer time)
- Postal code: 90080

Pattipola is a village that is mostly located in Badulla District, Uva Province with a small portion in Nuwara Eliya District of Central Province, Sri Lanka.

== Transport ==
Pattipola is served by the Pattipola railway station of the Sri Lanka Railways on the Main Line. It is the highest railway station in Sri Lanka with an elevation of 1,897.5 m (6,225 ft) high above mean sea level. Pattipola Tunnel is also located near Pattipola. It is the third longest and the highest railway tunnel in Sri Lanka.
