= St Nicholas Church, Littleborough =

Coordinates: 53.3341°N 0.7633°W

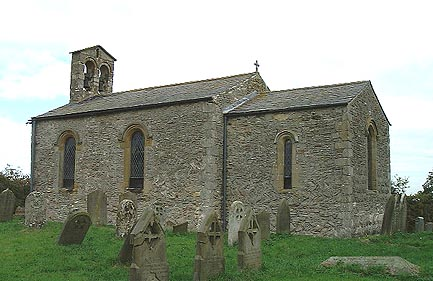
- St Nicholas Church from the southeast

- Location in Nottinghamshire
- OS grid reference: SK 824 826
- Location: Littleborough, Nottinghamshire
- Country: England
- Denomination: Anglican
- Website: Churches Conservation Trust

History
- Dedication: Saint Nicholas

Architecture
- Functional status: Redundant
- Heritage designation: Grade I
- Designated: 1 February 1967
- Architectural type: Church
- Style: Norman

Specifications
- Materials: Rubble including Roman bricks, stone dressings, slate roofs

St Nicholas Church is a redundant Anglican church in the hamlet of Littleborough, Nottinghamshire, England. It is recorded in the National Heritage List for England as a designated Grade I listed building, and is under the care of the Churches Conservation Trust.

== History ==
Littleborough stands on the site of the Roman town of Segelocum (or Agelocum), which was adjacent to a ford crossing the River Trent on the Roman road between Lincoln and York, by way of Doncaster. Littleborough is not mentioned in the Domesday Book, and there is speculation that the church was founded by William the Conqueror, as it stands in what was his manor of Mansfield. The church was probably built in the second half of the 11th century. It was restored in 1832, when the vestry was added. The vestry was rebuilt in 1900, and the church was restored again in 1973. It was vested in the Churches Conservation Trust on 1 April 1993.

== Architecture ==
=== Exterior ===
St Nicholas is a small church constructed of rubble which includes brick and Roman brick fragments. This is coursed in places and elsewhere it is in herring-bone design. The church has dressed stone quoins, ashlar dressings, and slate roofs. Its plan is simple, consisting of a two-bay nave, a single-bay chancel and a lean-to north vestry. On the west gable is a double bellcote, and on the east gable is a cross. At the west end of the church is a round-headed doorway, flanked by buttresses. On the north side of the church is a brick chimney stack and a single round-headed window. On the south side are two 19th-century round-headed windows. At the east end of the chancel is a single 19th-century round-headed window, and there is a similar window in the south wall. On the north side of the vestry is a three-light mullioned and transomed window.

=== Interior ===
The chancel arch dates from the 11th century. It incorporates two Saxon pillars. In the east window is stained glass dating from 1900. In the south wall of the chancel is a 14th-century trefoil-headed piscina. The font has a square base and a 17th-century eggcup-shaped bowl. Its cover dates from about the 18th century, and is domed with a ball finial. The lectern and reading desk date from the 19th century, and the oak benches from about 1900. The monuments date from between 1765 and 1855.

== See also ==
- List of churches preserved by the Churches Conservation Trust in the English Midlands
- Grade I listed buildings in Nottinghamshire
- Listed buildings in Sturton le Steeple
