= Henry Manaton =

English lawyer and Tory politician

Henry Manaton (1650–1716), of Harewood, Calstock, Cornwall, was an English lawyer and Tory politician who sat in the House of Commons at various times between 1689 and 1713.

== Biography ==
Manaton was the son of Henry Manaton of Trecarrell and his second wife Jane Mapowder, daughter of Narcissus Mapowder of Holsworthy Devon. He was admitted at Gray's Inn in 1671 and called to the bar in 1686. He married Martha Andrew, daughter of Solomon Andrew merchant of Lyme Regis on 3 August 1693.

In 1689 Manaton was elected Member of Parliament for Camelford and held the seat until 1695 when he decided not to stand. However he stood for Tavistock after the death of his brother in 1696, but was unsuccessful. He was re-elected at Camelford in 1698 and held the seat until 1703. During this time he was frequently absent from parliament and put into custody for non attendance. In the 1702 election he had stood for Camelford and Tavistock and petitioned against his defeat at Tavistock. As a result, he was seated for Tavistock in 1703 and gave up his seat at Camelford. At the 1708 British general election he was returned as Tory MP for Tavistock, but was defeated at Camelford. He voted against the impeachment of Henry Sacheverell in 1710. At the 1710 British general election, he was returned again as a Tory at Tavistock, but was unseated for flagrant bribery on 3 February 1711. He was elected again for Camelford in a by-election on 26 March 1711 but was unseated on petition on 8 May 1711. He was by this time the recorder of the town. In 1712 he was elected at a by-election as MP for Callington and held the seat until 1713. Manaton was frequently in opposition to war with France. He was usually classed as a Tory, although in his last parliament his unpredictable voting had him classed as "whimsical".

Manaton died before 16 May 1716. He left his estates in Cornwall, Devon and Somerset in trust for his cousin Francis Manaton of Manaton.

Parliament of England
Preceded by Sir Charles Scarborough; Nicholas Courtney	Member of Parliament for Camelford; 1689–1695; With: Ambrose Manaton	Succeeded by Ambrose Manaton; Robert Molesworth
Preceded by Sidney Wortley Montagu; Robert Molesworth	Member of Parliament for Camelford; 1698–1703; With: Dennys Glynn	Succeeded by Dennys Glynn; William Pole
Preceded by James Bulteel; Lord James Russell	Member of Parliament for Tavistock; 1703–1711; With: James Bulteel 1703–1708; Sir John Cope, Bt 1708–1711	Succeeded by James Bulteel; Sir John Cope, Bt
Preceded by Bernard Granville; Jasper Radcliffe	Member of Parliament for Camelford; 1711; With: Bernard Granville	Succeeded by Bernard Granville; Paul Orchard
Preceded by William Coryton; Samuel Rolle	Member of Parliament for Callington; 1711–1713; With: Samuel Rolle	Succeeded by John Coryton; Samuel Rolle
