= St Peter and St Paul's Church, Sturton-le-Steeple =

St Peter and St Paul’s Church, Sturton-le-Steeple
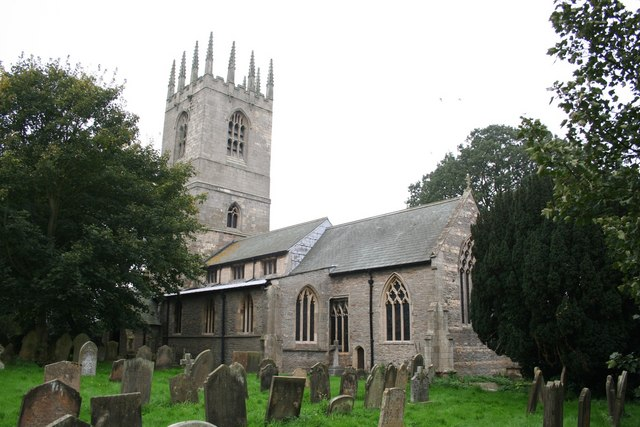
- St Peter and St Paul’s Church, Sturton-le-Steeple
- St Peter and St Paul’s Church, Sturton-le-Steeple
- 53°20′42.9″N 0°49′9.58″W
- OS grid reference: SK 78799 83871
- Location: Sturton le Steeple
- Country: England
- Denomination: Church of England

History
- Dedication: St Peter and St Paul

Architecture
- Heritage designation: Grade II* listed

Administration
- Province: York
- Diocese: Southwell and Nottingham
- Archdeaconry: Newark
- Deanery: Bassetlaw and Bawtry
- Parish: Sturton le Steeple

Clergy
- Archbishop: Archbishop of York
- Bishop(s): Bishop of Sherwood & Bishop of Southwell & Nottingham
- Rector: Rev M Cantrill
- Dean: Dean of Bassetlaw & Bawtry

St Peter and St Paul's Church, Sturton-le-Steeple is a Grade II* listed parish church in the Church of England in Sturton le Steeple, near Retford in Nottinghamshire. It is currently in the Clays Group of churches.

== History ==
The church dates from the 12th century. It burned down in 1901 and was rebuilt by Charles Hodgson Fowler opening in 1902.

Sturton Le Steeple was the birthplace of John Robinson, the "Pilgrim Pastor", in 1576.

== Bells ==
There are six bells in an eight bell cast iron frame. The back five bells are dated 1825 and were cast by Thomas II Mears. The treble was cast in 1991 by John Taylor & Co. The tenor weighs 10 cwt and the treble weighs 5 cwt.

== Monuments ==
There are monuments to Lady Oliva de Montbegon (d. 1236), and Dame Frances Earle (d. 1687). A marble slab marks the grave of Francis Thornhagh, the Parliamentary commander, who was killed at the Battle of Preston in 1648.

== See also ==
- Grade II* listed buildings in Nottinghamshire
- Listed buildings in Sturton le Steeple
