= Thomas White (1667–1732) =

English landowner and Whig politician

Thomas White (1667 – 30 September 1732) of Wallingwells, Nottinghamshire, was an English landowner and Whig politician who sat in the English and British House of Commons between 1701 and 1732.

== Early life and marriage ==
White was the son of John White of Tuxford and his wife Jane Williamson, daughter of Sir Thomas Williamson, Bt. He entered Gray's Inn on 22 July 1685 and was admitted at Christ's College, Cambridge on 14 July 1686.

By his marriage, White was responsible for the family eventually settling at Wallingwells. This was the result of losing his way one night. On his way home after a journey, he hoped to make the final leg of the trip from Sheffield to Tuxford in one evening. He was on horseback, followed by his servant and baggage. The land between Sheffield and Tuxford was in those days unenclosed and the roads were little more than packhorse tracks.

White lost his way in the darkness, but stumbled upon an ancient moated house, which had formerly been a priory.

The house was owned by Richard Taylor, a captain in the Nottinghamshire Militia, MP for East Retford and lately High Sheriff of Nottinghamshire.

Taylor put White up for the night and showed great hospitality to him.

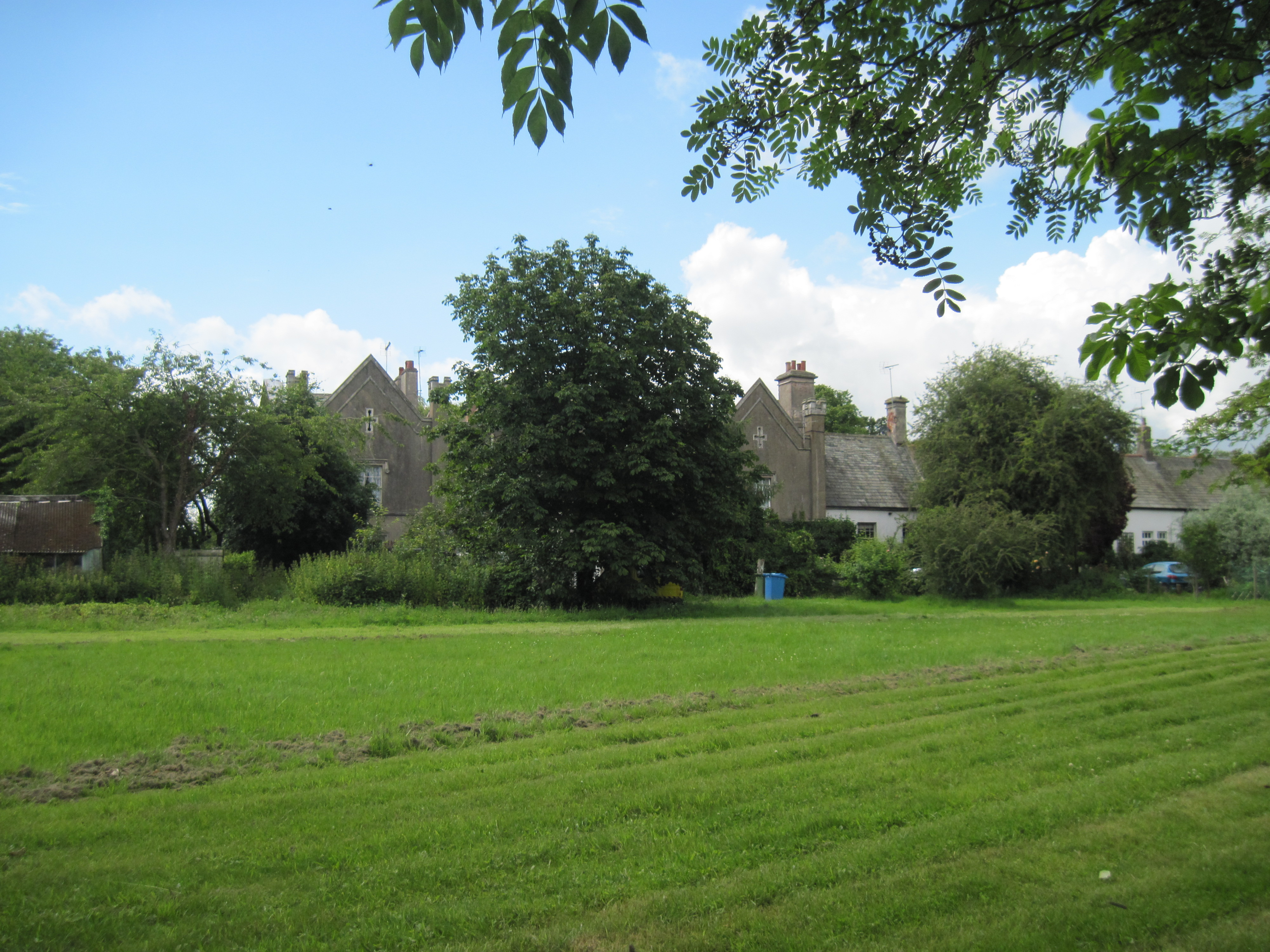
Wallingwells Hall, Nottinghamshire

White's host, Richard Taylor, was married to Bridget Knight, daughter of Sir Ralph Knight of Langold and Warsop, and had a single daughter Bridget, who was then aged 16 years. White was then 31 years old. After this accidental meeting of White and the Taylor family, White became good friends with the Taylors and regularly repeated his visits. He married Bridget Taylor at Carlton Church on 28 July 1698. When Richard Taylor died in the spring of 1699, White and his wife inherited his estates at Wallingwells and Buerly (Pately Bridge). They decided to move into Wallingwells at this time, making it their home and seat. Once in residence White was appointed as Deputy Lieutenant for Nottinghamshire.

== Political career ==
White was elected Member of Parliament for East Retford in the poll at the first general election of 1701 in January. However, he was unseated on petition on 15 April 1701. He was returned successfully at East Retford at the second general election of 1701 in December. He was elected in the poll again at the 1702 general election, but was again unseated on petition on 28 November 1702.

White did not stand again at the 1705 English general election. He was occupied with local administration, and in the year when there was a fear of invasion, he was investigating possible subversives of Catholic persuasion. At the 1708 general election at East Retford he was backed by Newcastle and the Whig interest, and came top in the poll. In Parliament, he voted for the impeachment of Dr Sacheverell. He was re-elected at the 1710 general election, but was unseated on 11 January 1711.

White was returned unopposed as MP for East Retford at the 1715 general election. At the time of the Jacobite rebellion, he was very active in the Nottinghamshire militia and reported to the new Duke of Newcastle on the decisions of the deputy-lieutenants. He was rewarded with the office of Clerk of the Ordnance of the Tower in 1718. He carried on voting with the Whigs for the remainder of his career in Parliament. He was returned again at the general elections of 1722 and 1727.

== Death and legacy ==
White died suddenly of an apoplectic fit at Wallingwells on 30 September 1732 aged 63 years. He is buried under the High Altar in Tuxford Church. His widow Bridget continued to live at Wallingwells until her death on 17 January 1761. White and his wife Bridget had five children:

1. John White (1699 – 7 September 1769)
2. Taylor White (1701–1772)
3. Bridget White, married Sir John Heathcote, 2nd Baronet in 1720
4. Anne White (died 27 February 1744), married Sir Griffith Boynton, 5th Baronet on 6 April 1742. She died five days after the birth of her son Griffith.
5. Mary White (5 February 1710 – 29 September 1785), unmarried

White was described by his third cousin Lady Mary Wortley Montagu as a jovial countryman. George Gregory said of him that he had ‘lost a good friend and the public a good officer’ and the country a ‘useful person among us’.

Parliament of England
Preceded by John Thornhagh; Sir Willoughby Hickman	Member of Parliament for East Retford; Jan 1701–Apr 1701; With: John Thornhagh	Succeeded by John Thornhagh; Sir Willoughby Hickman
Preceded by John Thornhagh; Sir Willoughby Hickman	Member of Parliament for East Retford; 1701–1702; With: John Thornhagh	Succeeded by Sir Willoughby Hickman; William Levinz
Parliament of Great Britain
Preceded by Sir Hardolph Wastneys; Robert Molesworth	Member of Parliament for East Retford; 1708–1711; With: William Levinz 1708–1710; Thomas Westby 1710–1711	Succeeded by Willoughby Hickman; Bryan Cooke
Preceded by Francis Lewis; John Digby	Member of Parliament for East Retford; 1715–1732; With: John Digby 1715–1722; Patrick Chaworth 1722–1727; Sir Robert Clifton 1727–1732	Succeeded by Sir Robert Clifton; John White
Political offices
Preceded by Edward Ashe	Clerk of the Ordnance; 1718–1732	Succeeded by Leonard Smelt
