= Littleborough, Nottinghamshire =

Village in Nottinghamshire, England

Coordinates: 53.334°N 0.763°W

Littleborough
- Village
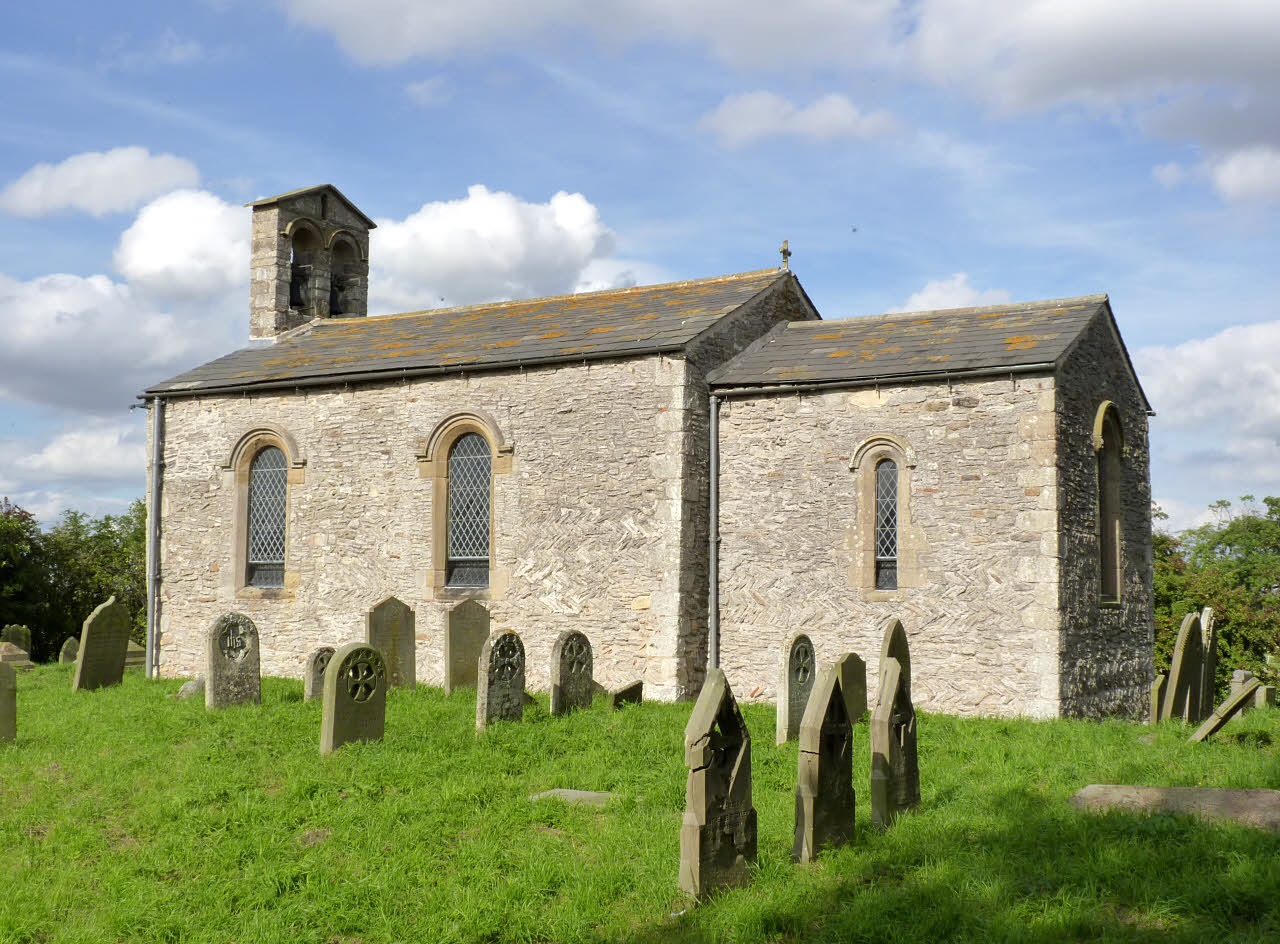
- St Nicholas Church

- Location within Nottinghamshire
- OS grid reference: SK824825
- Civil parish: Sturton le Steeple
- District: Bassetlaw
- Shire county: Nottinghamshire
- Region: East Midlands
- Country: England
- Sovereign state: United Kingdom
- Post town: Retford
- Postcode district: DN22
- Police: Nottinghamshire
- Fire: Nottinghamshire
- Ambulance: East Midlands
- Website: Sturton le Steeple

Littleborough is a village and former civil parish, now in the parish of Sturton le Steeple, within the Bassetlaw district and county of Nottinghamshire, England. It is 8 miles (13 km) east of Retford. Littleborough is the site of the Roman town of Segelocum or Agelocum, on the west bank of the River Trent where the road linking Lincoln and Doncaster bridged or forded the river. In 1931 the parish had a population of 32. On 1 April 1935 the parish was abolished and merged with Sturton le Steeple.

The Church of England parish church of St Nicholas is Norman, and contains some Roman tiles in its stonework. The church is no longer in use.

== Littleborough Ferry ==
A ferry existed here for centuries. In 1825 a toll road from Retford to Littleborough and on to Lincoln was opened. Due to competition from Dunham, in 1830 the turnpike trust engaged Mr Timothy Bramah (son of Joseph Bramah) to design a bridge. However, in 1832 Dunham bridge opened but there was no progress at Littleborough.

In 1912-1913 new plans to build a bridge on site of 'old Roman ford' and undercut Gainsborough toll bridge were proposed but never proceeded.

Despite this in 1897 there were complaints that the ferry had been 'stopped' on the orders of the landowner, Mr Foljambe. Only a small foot boat was available – the defence being that a ferry 'did not pay'. In 1898 it had a new boat but this was too small to take horse and trap. Previously there was a cart ferry – and also a foot ferry.

In 1900 Foljambe sued the Trent Navigation after their boat damaged the ferry. It had been drifting in a flood, cutting the chain across the Trent and capsizing the ferry. The defence argued that the ferry had not been used for months and possibly had a hole in it. The Judge ruled for the Navigation.

In 1905 Foljambe said he would abandon it and no council was prepared to pay for a legal challenge. Nottinghamshire County Council had no powers to operate a ferry. Thus in 1912 there were new calls for a bridge. The 1920 Ferries (Acquisition by local authorities) Act made it possible for councils to run a ferry but the local councils refused anything for Littleborough. In 1920 the cost of a new ferry and landing stages was estimated at £3000.

William Stukely's map of Littleborough (1724) shows two possible arms of the Trent enclosing the Roman town of Segelocum (or Agelocum). This might explain why the Roman fort at Manton now lies across the river rather than close to the hamlet.

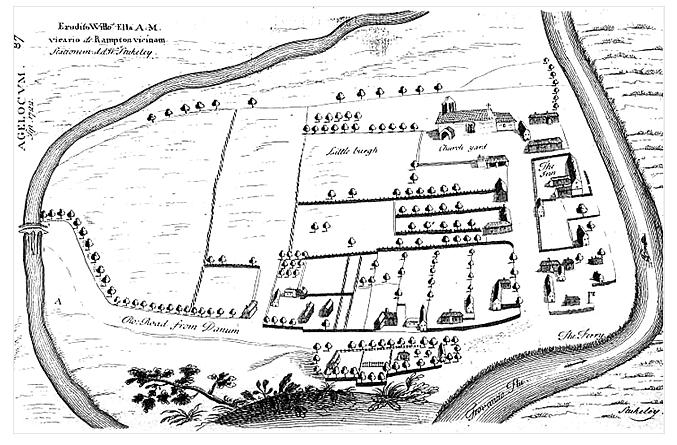
William Stukely's map of Littleborough (1724)

== See also ==
- Listed buildings in Sturton le Steeple
