= Richard Taylor (died 1699) =

English Member of Parliament

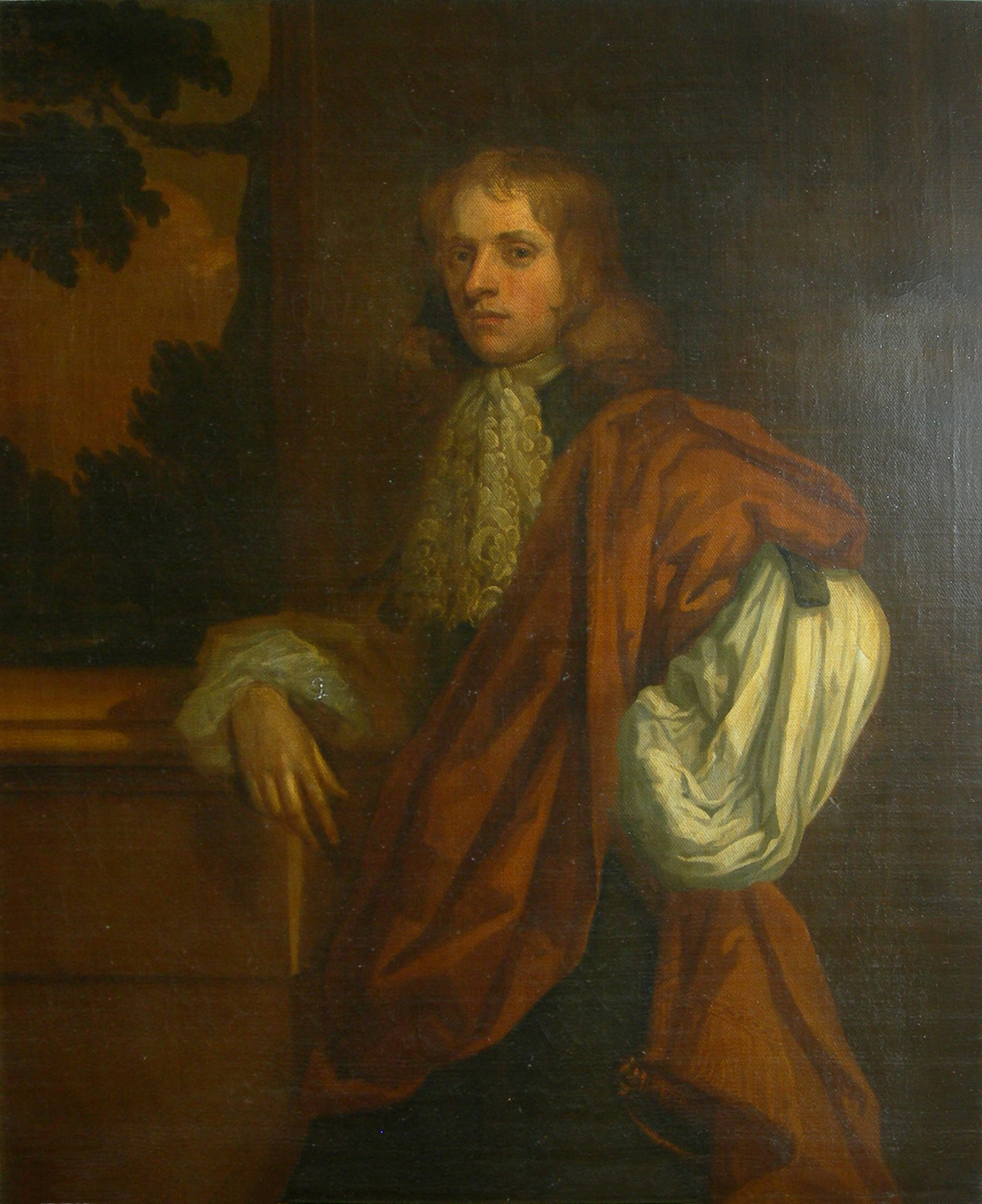
Richard Taylor of Wallingwells

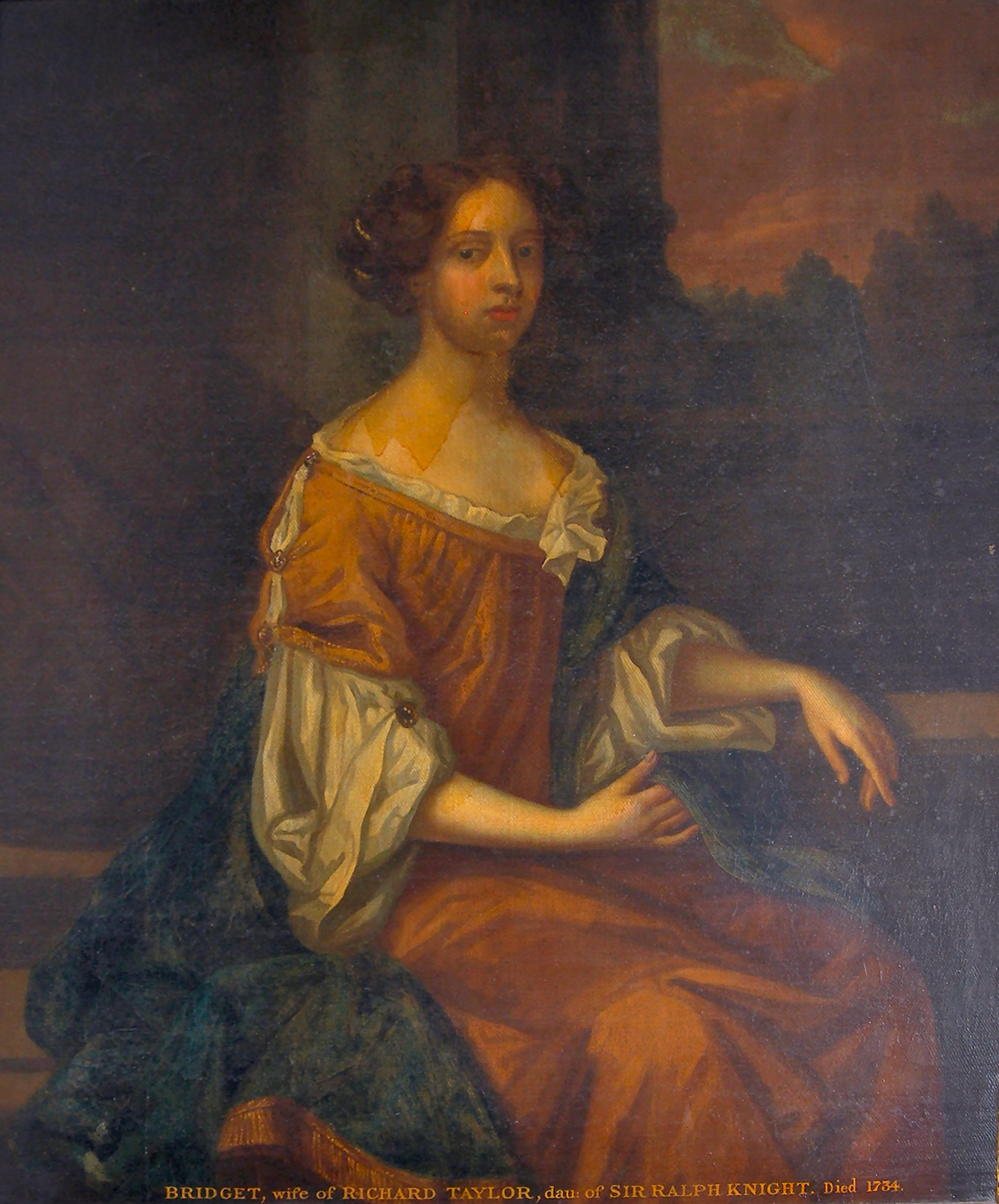
Bridget Taylor, daughter of Sir Ralph Knight, Knt., wife of Richard Taylor of Wallingwells

Richard Taylor (c. 1649 – 20 April 1699) was an English Member of Parliament. He was the only son of Major Samuel Taylor of Wallingwells Priory, Nottinghamshire. He succeeded his father in 1679.

He was appointed High Sheriff of Nottinghamshire for 1689–90 and elected MP for East Retford in 1690, holding the seat until 1698.

He died in 1699 and was buried at Carlton. He had married Bridget, the daughter of Sir Ralph Knight of Langold and Warsop, Nottinghamshire, with whom he had a son, whom he outlived, and a daughter, also named Bridget, who married Thomas White and was the mother of John and Taylor White. On Taylor's death, the family seat at Wallingwells passed to his daughter Bridget and became the main seat of the White family.

Parliament of England
Preceded by Hon. Evelyn Pierrepont; John Thornhagh	Member of Parliament for East Retford; 1690–1698; With: John Thornhagh	Succeeded by John Thornhagh; Sir Willoughby Hickman
Honorary titles
Preceded by Sir Thomas Parkyns	High Sheriff of Nottinghamshire; 1689–1690	Succeeded by Sir Nathaniel Curzon
