= Ambrose Manaton (died 1696) =

English landowner and politician

Ambrose Manaton (1648–1696) was an English landowner and politician who sat in the House of Commons variously between 1678 and 1696.

Manaton was the son of Ambrose Manaton of Trecarrell and his second wife Jane Mapowder, daughter of Narcissus Mapowder of Holsworthy Devon. He was admitted at Gray's Inn in 1666 and at Exeter College, Oxford in 1667.

In 1678 Manaton was elected Member of Parliament for Newport (Cornwall) and held the seat until 1681. He was also mayor of Tintagel from 1679 to 1680. In 1689 he was elected MP for Camelford. In 1695 he stood at both Camelford and Tavistock. He sat again for Camelford, but petitioned against his defeat at Tavistock. In March 1696 he was seated for Tavistock and then resigned from Camelford.

Manaton showed frequent ill-health in his parliamentary absences in the 1690s and died at the age of 48.

Manaton married firstly Elizabeth Kelly, daughter of William Kelly of Kilworthy on 29 October 1674, and secondly Rachel Carew, daughter of Sir John Carew, 3rd Baronet on 23 October 1690. A portrait of Rachel Carew at Antony House near Saltash was the inspiration behind the character in the novel My Cousin Rachel by Daphne du Maurier.

Parliament of England
Preceded by Nicholas Morice; John Speccot	Member of Parliament for Newport (Cornwall); 1678–1681; With: Nicholas Morice 1678–1679; John Coryton 1679; William Coryton 1679–1681; William Morice 1681	Succeeded by William Morice; John Speccot
Preceded by Sir Charles Scarborough; Nicholas Courtney	Member of Parliament for Camelford; 1689–1696; With: Henry Manaton; Robert Molesworth	Succeeded by Sidney Wortley Montagu; Robert Molesworth
Preceded by Lord Robert Russell; Lord James Russell	Member of Parliament for Tavistock; 1696; With: Lord Robert Russell	Succeeded by Lord Robert Russell; Sir Francis Drake, Bt
