= William Levinz (MP) =

English Member of Parliament (died 1747)

William Levinz (c. 1671–1747) of Grove Hall and Bilby, Nottinghamshire was a British lawyer and Tory politician who sat in the English and British House of Commons between 1702 and 1734. He fought a duel with an opposing Whig agent.

== Early life ==
Levinz was the eldest son of Sir Creswell Levinz of Evenley, Northamptonshire, a prominent lawyer, and his wife Elizabeth Livesay, daughter of William Livesay of Lancashire. His uncle William Levinz was professor of Greek at Oxford, and another uncle Baptist Levinz was Bishop of Sodor and Man. He was admitted at Gray's Inn in 1681 and matriculated at St John's College, Oxford, where his uncle William Levinz was president, on 26 August 1688, aged 17. In 1689, he transferred to Inner Temple and in 1693 he was called to the bar. He married Ann Buck, daughter of Samuel Buck of Gray's Inn on 4 June 1693. He succeeded his father in 1701 to his estates. one of which carried with it an electoral interest at Retford.

== Career ==
Levinz became one of the leaders of the Tories in Nottinghamshire. He stood as a Tory for East Retford at the second general election of 1701 but was defeated and his petition was dismissed. At the 1702 English general election he was defeated again but this time his petition prevailed and he was returned as Member of Parliament for East Retford on 28 November 1702. He was a very active member and was a teller on several occasions in Parliament. At the 1705 English general election, he was returned again for East Retford, but was unseated on petition on 17 January 1706. He was High Sheriff of Nottinghamshire for the year 1707 to 1708. He was returned again as MP for East Retford at the 1708 British general election, when the Whig forces were divided over the ravages of the deer in Sherwood Forest. He fought a duel on 14 January 1709 with William Jessop, legal adviser and election manager to John Holles, 1st Duke of Newcastle, in which Jessop was wounded. Levinz voted against the impeachment of Dr Sacheverell in 1710. At the 1710 British general election he stood for Nottinghamshire where he was successfully returned. He was busy again in Parliament and was listed as a ‘worthy patriot’ who had helped to detect the mismanagements of the previous ministry. In 1712 he was elected a Commissioner to inquire into crown grants. He presented an address from Nottinghamshire in favour of the peace in August 1712, and he voted against the French commerce bill on 18 June 1713. At the 1713 British general election he was returned unopposed for Nottinghamshire. He supported the government but demonstrated his Hanoverian loyalty when it was said in August 1715 that he was ‘as zealous to put the laws in execution against Roman Catholics as anybody’.

Levinz was returned unopposed at the 1715 British general election. He contributed £100 towards the cost of raising a Nottinghamshire regiment in the 1715 Jacobite rebellion. He was defeated in a close contest at the 1722 British general election of which he wrote ‘the methods of menaces and promises have been so extravagant and the corruption so open and avowed’. In 1727 he threatened to join Sir Robert Clifton in contesting both East Retford and Nottinghamshire, with influential Whig support, but in the end he made an agreement with the local Whig leaders not to stand himself for the county if they would not oppose his nominee at East Retford. In 1732, both the Whig Members for Nottinghamshire vacated their seats at the same time, and Levinz compromised again. He was returned for one of the vacancies and a Whig candidate for the other at the by-election on 30 May 1732. Levinz’ son William came of age in 1734 and at the 1734 Levinz made an agreement with the Whigs so that his son was returned at Nottinghamshire in his place.

== Death and legacy ==
Levinz died in May 1747 leaving a son and two daughters.

Parliament of England
Preceded by Thomas White; John Thornhagh	Member of Parliament for East Retford; 1702–1706; With: Sir Willoughby Hickman	Succeeded by Sir Hardolph Wastneys; Robert Molesworth
Parliament of Great Britain
Preceded by Sir Hardolph Wastneys; Robert Molesworth	Member of Parliament for East Retford; 1708–1710; With: Thomas White	Succeeded by Thomas Westby; Thomas White
Preceded by John Thornhagh; Sir Thomas Willoughby	Member of Parliament for Nottinghamshire; 1710–1722; With: The Viscount Howe 2720-2723; Hon. Francis Willoughby 1713-2733	Succeeded by The Viscount Howe; Sir Robert Sutton
Preceded by The Viscount Howe; Sir Robert Sutton	Member of Parliament for Nottinghamshire; 1732–1734; With: Thomas Bennet	Succeeded by William Levinz (junior); Thomas Bennet
