= Francis Thornhagh =

Colonel, JP, MP, High Sheriff of Nottinghamshire

Personal details
- Born: 1617 Fenton, Nottinghamshire
- Died: 1648 (aged 30–31) Battle of Preston (1648)
- Spouse(s): Elizabeth, daughter of John St. Andrew
- Children: John Thornhagh, 2 daughters
- Parent(s): Francis Thornhagh (1593-1643), Jane, daughter of Sir John Jackson of Hickleton, Yorkshire

Colonel Francis Thornhagh or Thornhaugh (1617–1648) was a hero of the Parliamentarian cause in the English Civil War, an MP of East Retford and High Sheriff of Nottinghamshire, who was killed at the Battle of Preston in 1648.

== Personal life ==
Francis Thornhagh (1617-1648) was the eldest son of Francis Thornhagh (1593-1643) and his wife Jane, daughter of Sir John Jackson of Hickleton, Yorkshire. He was born at Fenton, Nottinghamshire and educated at the Free School in Lincoln and Magdalene College, Cambridge from where he matriculated in 1635 at the age of 17.

In late 1640 or early 1641 he married Elizabeth, second daughter and coheiress of John St. Andrew of Gotham, Nottinghamshire. Francis and Elizabeth lived on St. Mary's Hill, Nottingham and at his wife's property Rushcliffe Hall, Gotham, as his mother continued to reside at the family estate at Fenton until her death in 1661. They had a son John and two daughters. After Thornhagh's death his widow married William Skeffington.

== Civilian career ==
Thornhagh was admitted as a member of the Inner Temple in November 1636 and was made a Justice of the Peace in 1642. Like his father, he was appointed High Sheriff of Nottinghamshire for 1643–4. He was then elected as MP for East Retford, taking his seat when the town was freed from the Royalists in 1646.

== Military career and English Civil War ==
Between 1638 and 1640 Thornhagh fought in the Netherlands in the Thirty Years' War under the future Parliamentarian general, the Earl of Essex. He was a Parliamentarian and at the outbreak of the English Civil War was appointed a member of the parliamentary committee for Nottinghamshire alongside his father. He was also appointed Lieutenant-Colonel of his father's horse regiment. His father died on 28 April 1643, leaving Thornhagh estates at Fenton, Sturton and Littleborough.

During the English Civil War he served under Oliver Cromwell in Lincolnshire and was wounded at the relief of Gainsborough in 1643 and again at the Second Siege of Newark in 1644. After Lord Willoughby panicked and fled at the Siege of Newark, taking most of the Parliamentarian cavalry with him, Thornhagh rallied the remaining troops and charged the royalist line. He was so badly wounded he was not expected to survive and was taken to Nottingham to die. But against the odds he recovered, and returned to active service. Thornhaugh then reinforced Poyntz at the Battle of Rowton Heath in 1645, later leading the regiment to reduce the garrisons of the Nottinghamshire Royalists, ending the First Civil War at the third and final siege of Newark. He was commended by Parliament for his "many great and faithful services" and was given a £1,000 prize for his gallantry (equivalent to £237,000 in 2020).

In 1647, Thornhaugh's regiment sided with the army.

During the Second English Civil War in 1648, Thornhagh and the Nottinghamshire Horse served under Cromwell at the Siege of Pembroke and later when a Scottish army under the Duke of Hamilton marched south, Thornhagh marched under Cromwell's command to meet them. He was killed near Chorley during the Battle of Preston.

A full-length portrait of Thornhagh in his armour survives at Osberton Hall, Scofton. AC Wood describes this portrait as showing "a man of height and impressive carriage. His tawny hair, unadorned by any art falls to the shoulders and is matched by a moustache and a suspicion of an 'Imperial' beard of the same yellowish hue. The face is inclined to be long and the expression serious, and although the features are not distinguished the general effect is one of dignity and hidden strength." Mrs Lucy Hutchinson describes him as "of a most excellent good nature to all men and zealous for his friend: he wanted counsel and deliberation and was sometimes too facile to flatterers, but had judgment enough to discern his errors when they were represented to him, and worth enough not to persist in an injurious mistake because he had once entertained it."

== Death and aftermath ==
Thoroton says that Thornhagh met his death at "the end of a Scottish lance" at the Battle of Preston. Cromwell reported to the Speaker of the House of Commons that he had ordered Thornhagh to command two or three regiments of horse to follow the enemy but he advanced too boldly, and was "run into the body and thigh and head by the Enemy's lancers".

Cromwell reminded the Speaker of the House of Commons that Thornhagh had always been "faithful and gallant in your service as any", and had left children and "a sad Widow" who, he said, were now "the interest of the Commonwealth". The House of Commons responded to Cromwell's appeal by an order, 'that it be referred to the committee of the Northern Association to consider and present some way of satisfaction to be given to the wife and children of Colonel Thornhagh'.

Hutchinson provides more details about Thornhagh's death, saying that he was wounded at the beginning of the battle. She says that he was "faint and all covered with blood, of his enemies as well as his own," and was taken off the field by his own men. Thornhagh did not die immediately because according to Hutchinson he had "an eager desire to know the success of that battle." At the end of the day when the news was brought to him that the battle was won, Hutchinson says "he cleared his dying countenance, and said, 'I now rejoice to die, since God hath let me see the overthrow of this perfidious enemy; I could not lose my life in a better cause, and I have the favour from God to see my blood avenged'."

Thornhagh was initially buried where he fell, but his body was later retrieved and transferred to St Peter and St Paul's Church at Sturton le Steeple.
