= Molesworth =

Molesworth may refer to:

== Places ==
=== Australia ===
- Molesworth, Tasmania, Australia, a town
- Molesworth, Victoria, Australia, a town

=== New Zealand ===
- Molesworth Station, New Zealand's largest farm
- Molesworth Street, Wellington, the street where New Zealand's Parliament Buildings are located
- Molesworth, a proposed name for Nelson by the New Zealand Company

=== United Kingdom ===
- Molesworth, Cambridgeshire, a village in Huntingdonshire, Cambridgeshire, England
- RAF Molesworth, a US air force base near Molesworth, Cambridgeshire, England

=== Elsewhere ===
- Molesworth (crater), a crater on Mars
- Molesworth Street, Dublin, Ireland
- Molesworth, Ontario, a community in Southwestern Ontario, Canada

== Organizations ==
- Molesworth Institute, a library-related organization in the United States

== People ==
- Molesworth (surname)

=== Family titles ===
- Viscount Molesworth of Swords
- Baron Molesworth of Philipstown, (see Viscount Molesworth)
- Baronet Molesworth of Pencarrow (Molesworth-St Aubyn Baronets)

=== Fictional characters ===
- Nigel Molesworth, a fictional character in a series of humorous books by Geoffrey Willans parodying school life
