= Willoughby Hickman (1688–1712) =

Willoughby Hickman (1688–1712) was a British politician who sat in the House of Commons from 1711 to 1712.

Hickman was the third son of Sir Willoughby Hickman, 3rd Baronet of Gainsborough, Lincolnshire and his wife Anne Anderson, daughter of Sir Stephen Anderson, 1st Baronet, of Eyworth, Bedfordshire and was baptized on. 18 June 1688. He matriculated at Christ Church, Oxford on 11 February 1705, aged 18.

Hickman contested East Retford as a Tory on his father's interest at the 1710 general election. He came third in the poll but was seated on petition as Member of Parliament on 11 January 1711. He served in Parliament for under 18 months and made little contribution to Commons’ business before his death.

Hickman died in May 1712 and was buried at Gainsborough on 16 May 1712.

Parliament of Great Britain
Preceded by Thomas Westby; Thomas White	Member of Parliament for East Retford; 1711–1712; With: Bryan Cooke	Succeeded by Francis Lewis; Bryan Cooke
