= John Thornhagh =

English Whig politician (1648–1723)

John Thornhagh (1648–1723), of Fenton and Osberton, Nottinghamshire, was an English Whig politician who sat in the English and British House of Commons between 1689 and 1710.

Thornhagh was baptized on 27 January 1648 at St Mary's Nottingham, the only son of Francis Thornhagh, MP for East Retford and his wife Elizabeth St Andrew, daughter of John St Andrew of Gotham, Nottinghamshire. He succeeded his father in 1648. He was admitted at Jesus College, Cambridge on 1 June 1664. He married Elizabeth Earle, the daughter of Sir Richard Earle, 1st Baronet, of Stragglethorpe, Lincolnshire, on 15 September 1670.

Thornhagh was Commissioner for assessment for Nottinghamshire from 1673 to 1680. In February 1688, he was appointed a Justice of the Peace . He was High Sheriff of Nottinghamshire for the year 1688 to 1689 and was a Deputy Lieutenant for Nottinghamshire thereafter. At the 1689 English general election, he was elected Member of Parliament for East Retford as a Court candidate. He was moderately active in the convention, sitting on 21 committees. He was Commissioner for assessment for Nottinghamshire again in 1690 and was returned unopposed at the 1690 English general election. He was returned unopposed at the 1695 English general election and voted for the attainder of Sir John Fenwick on 25 November 1696. At the 1698 English general election, he was returned unopposed for East Retford, but faced a contest in the first general election of 1701. In the second general election of 1701 he stood for Nottinghamshire, where he was defeated, and for East Retford, where he was returned again in a contest. He was returned again for East Retford at the 1702 English general election, but was unseated on petition on 28 November 1702.

Thornhagh was returned as Whig MP for Nottinghamshire at a by-election on 29 March 1704. He was returned again as a Whig at the 1705 English general election and on 25 October 1705 he voted for the Court candidate as Speaker. He continued to follow the Whig line, and on 18 February 1706, voted to support the Court over the ‘place clause’ of the regency bill. At the 1708 British general election he was returned unopposed through an electoral pact with Sir Thomas Willoughby. He voted for the naturalization of the Palatines in 1709 and for the impeachment of Dr Sacheverell in 1710. He faced a contest at the 1710 general election and came bottom of the poll. He did not stand again.

Thornhagh was buried at Sturton, Nottinghamshire, on 17 May 1723. He had three sons and five daughters. He was succeeded by his son St Andrew Thornhagh.

Parliament of England
Preceded by Sir Edward Nevill; John Millington	Member of Parliament for East Retford; 1689–1702; With: Hon. Evelyn Pierrepont 1689–1690; Richard Taylor 1690–1698; Sir Willoughby Hickman 1698–1701, 1701; Thomas White 1701, 1701–1702	Succeeded by Sir Willoughby Hickman; William Levinz
Preceded by Sir Francis Molyneux; Gervase Eyre	Member of Parliament for Nottinghamshire; 1704–1707; With: Sir Francis Molyneux 1704–1705; Sir Thomas Willoughby 1705–1707	Succeeded by Parliament of Great Britain
Parliament of Great Britain
Preceded by Parliament of England	Member of Parliament for Nottinghamshire; 1707–1710; With: Sir Thomas Willoughby	Succeeded by The Viscount Howe; William Levinz
Honorary titles
Preceded by John Dand	High Sheriff of Nottinghamshire; 1688–1689	Succeeded by Sir Thomas Parkyns
