= Fenton, Nottinghamshire =

Hamlet in Nottinghamshire, England

Coordinates: 53.3393°N 0.81°W

Fenton is a hamlet in Nottinghamshire, England. It is about 9 kilometres (5.6 mi) east of Retford. Population details are included in the civil parish of Sturton le Steeple.

Fenton was a possession of the Thornhaugh family since the reign of Henry VI. Residents of Fenton Hall, some were members of parliament or served as High Sheriff of Nottinghamshire. Francis Thornhagh (1617–1648) was a Parliamentarian colonel who died in the Battle of Preston and was buried at Sturton le Steeple. His son, John Thornhagh, was a long-serving Whig member of parliament.

== See also ==
- Listed buildings in Sturton le Steeple
