= John Statham =

English politician

John Statham (fl. 1388) was an English politician.

He was a member (MP) of the parliament of England for Totnes in September 1388.
