= Sturton le Steeple =

Village and civil parish in Nottinghamshire, England

Coordinates: 53.35°N 0.82°W

- Village and civil parish
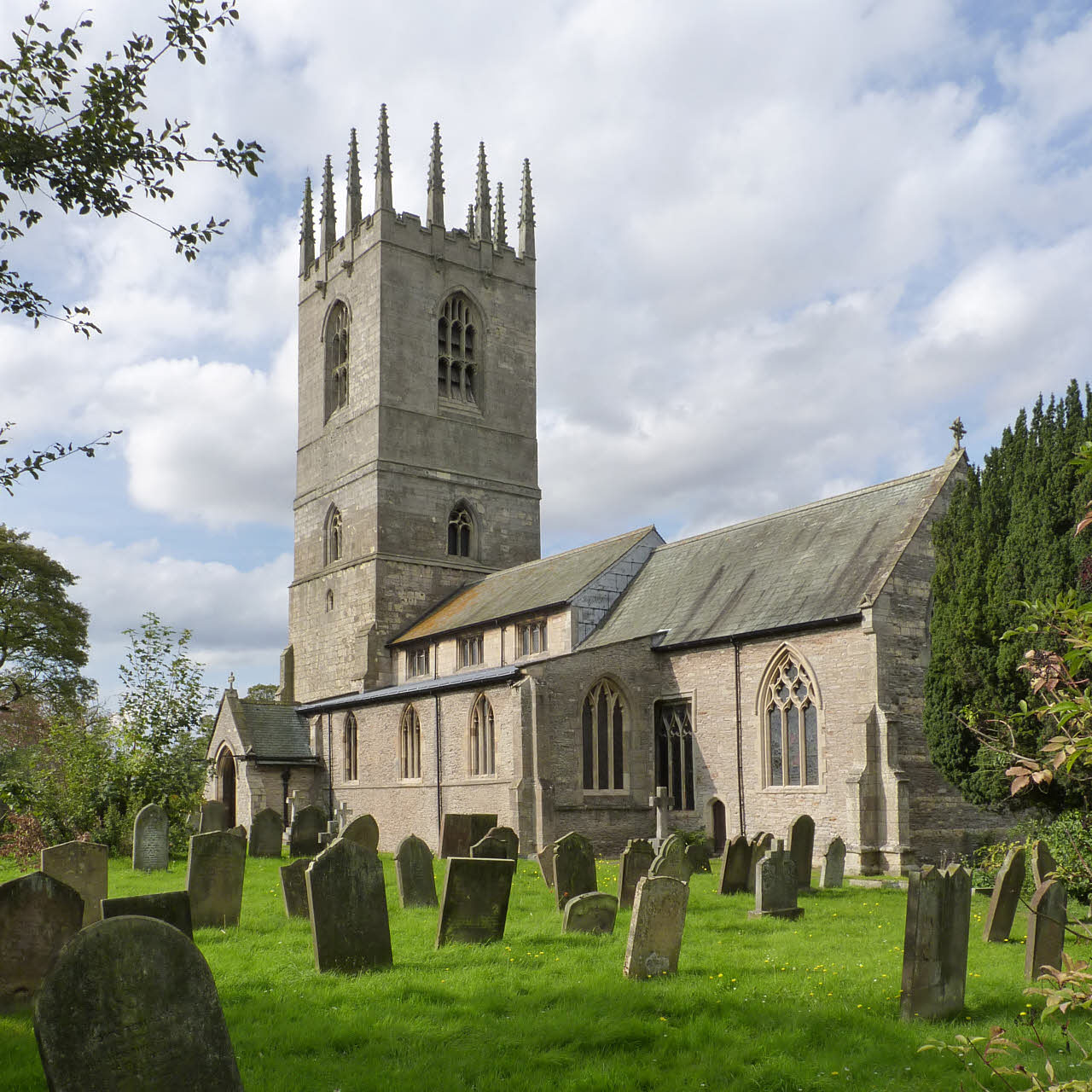
- Church of St Peter and St Paul

- Location within Nottinghamshire
- Interactive map of Sturton le Steeple
- Area: 6.71 sq mi (17.4 km^{2})
- Population: 545 (2021)
  - Density: 81/sq mi (31/km^{2})
- OS grid reference: SK 787838
  - London: 130 mi (210 km) SSE
- District: Bassetlaw
- Shire county: Nottinghamshire
- Region: East Midlands
- Country: England
- Sovereign state: United Kingdom
- Settlements: Sturton le Steeple; Fenton; Littleborough
- Post town: RETFORD
- Postcode district: DN22
- Dialling code: 01427
- Police: Nottinghamshire
- Fire: Nottinghamshire
- Ambulance: East Midlands
- UK Parliament: Bassetlaw
- Website: www.sturtonlesteepleparishcouncil.gov.uk

Sturton le Steeple is a village located 6 miles (9.7 km) east of Retford, Nottinghamshire, England. According to the 2001 census it had a population (including Littleborough and Fenton) of 497, reducing slightly to 486 at the 2011 census, but increasing to 545 residents in the 2021 census.

== Origin of the name ==
The village of Sturton-le-Steeple changed its name several times before settling upon its final form. Its name is made up of two elements - the older 'Sturton' and the additional 'le-Steeple'. Locally, it is often shortened to simply 'Sturton'. Although it is called 'le-Steeple' the parish church does not have a steeple.

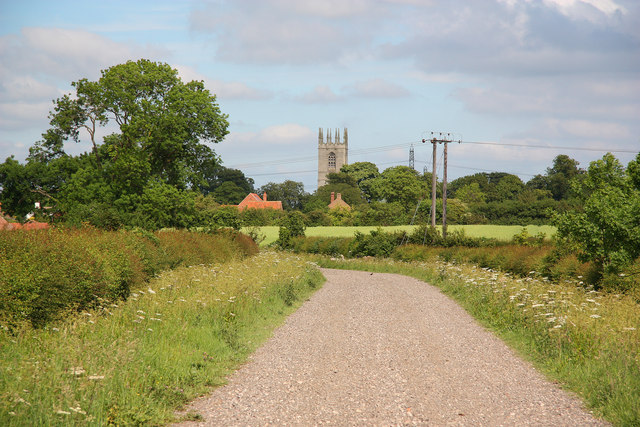
Bridle Path near Sturton Le Steeple

The first reference to the village is in the Domesday Book (1086) when it is referred to as 'Estretone'. This name derives from two elements 'Stret' (street) and 'tun' (town). This is thought to refer to the Roman road, Ermine Street, which ran from Lincoln to York and which crossed the River Trent 2 miles southeast of the village. The village grew up on a dry point near this crossing and was given the name Stretton or 'Street Town'. (The village sign now has the title 'The Town on the Street' on the bottom.)

Through its early history the village's name is spelt in a variety of ways:

- Stretuna (c.1190)
- Stretton (1215)
- Stretton in le Clay (1263, 1302)
- Overstrettone and Netherstrettone (1305, 1375)
- Stratton (1166,1167,1169,1203,1240, 1245, 1246, 1280)
- Straton (1200)
- Styrton (1499)
- Styrton in le Clay (1505)
- Stirton (1504–15, 1512)
- Sturton (1513)
- Sturton in le Cley (1552)
- Sturton le Steeple (1732)
- Sturton in Ye Steeple (1746)
- Sturton oth. Sturton in the Steeple (1769).

'Le Clay' refers to the North Clay division of Bassetlaw in which it is situated. The epithet 'le Steeple' was not recorded until quite late in the village's history (it is first recorded in 1732) and it has been suggested that it referred to the pinnacles on the tower of the parish church because famously the church does not have a steeple (A. Hamilton Thompson, Memorials of Old Nottinghamshire 52). The Survey of English Place Names Project considers it more likely that the name refers to the tower itself, as in older forms of English a steeple is simply a tall tower, rather than a spire.

== Notable buildings ==
=== Church of St Peter and St Paul ===
The Grade II* listed parish church of St Peter and St Paul has a 14th-century tower with 12 pinnacles. Cornelius Brown (1896) noted that "the massive tower of [the] parish church is a prominent feature in the landscape". Arthur Mee, writing in 1938, notes that the lower half of the tower was 600 years old and the upper storeys 15th century. He says: "It is almost the only part of the church which escaped a fire at the beginning of this century; the rest has been reconstructed on the old lines with much of the old material. The chancel is said to have been the original Norman church, and with the Norman masonry in its north wall is a Norman window now open to the vestry. The north and south doorways are Norman, and so is the bowl of the font, which came from the vanished church of West Burton; it is charmingly set on a flight of steps in the tower." The church contains a marble slab marking the final resting place of the Parliamentarian colonel Francis Thornhagh.

The churchyard at Sturton contains three war graves - two from World War I and one from World War II. (Latitude: 53.34622, Longitude: -0.81816)

=== Other notable buildings ===
The village has a cluster of 21 Grade II listed buildings and structures around its core. These are largely 17th to 19th century domestic and agricultural buildings, but also of note is the medieval settlement and open field system immediately southeast of Low Farm. Bassetlaw Council has also designated a large number (just under 50) of non-designated heritage assets.

=== The Manchester, Sheffield and Lincolnshire railway ===
Manchester, Sheffield and Lincolnshire Railway was constructed in the 1840s, with a station being built at Sturton in 1850. The station was closed to passengers in 1959 and finally closed in 1964. The Station Master's House still survives.

== Notable residents ==
- Sir Geoffrey Fenton (1539–1608), the poet and politician was born in Sturton Le Steeple.
- Edward Fenton (died 1603), the navigator and brother of Geoffrey Fenton was born in Sturton Le Steeple.
- William Grey, who according to the parish records died aged 119 (b. 23 April 1659 d. 1778).
- John Lassells, who was burnt at the stake in 1546 and is known as a prominent English Protestant martyr. John Lassells acquired the manor of Sturton in 1540 after the execution of its former owner, Thomas Lord Darcy.
- Pastor John Robinson was born in Sturton Le Steeple about 1576, the first child of John and Ann Robinson. John Robinson was the founder of the Pilgrims who sailed to North America on the Mayflower. Robinson himself died in The Netherlands in 1625.
- John Smythe the theologian and minister was born in Sturton, later dying in The Netherlands in 1612.
- Colonel Francis Thornagh is buried in Sturton after he was killed leading the Parliamentary army against the Royalists in the Battle of Preston (1648). He was the MP for Retford at his death, which was announced by Oliver Cromwell in Parliament.
