= John Molesworth (priest) =

Church of England clergyman (1790–1877)

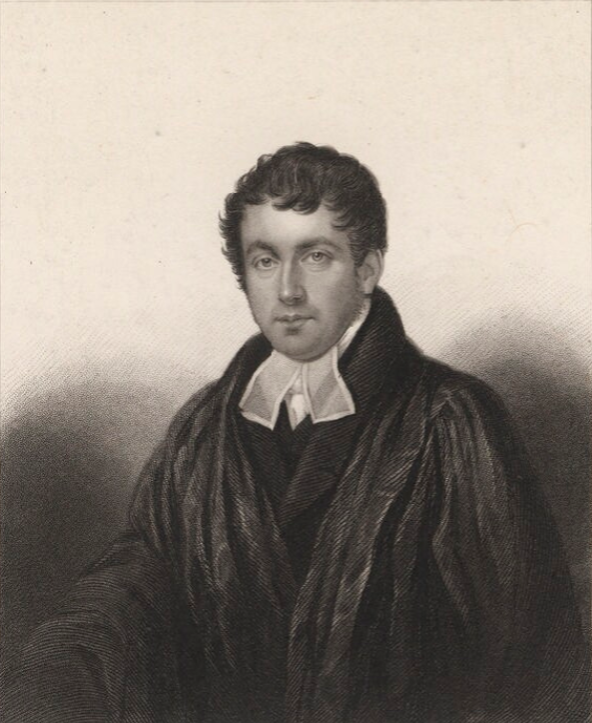
National Portrait Gallery's portrait of Rev. John Edward Nassau Molesworth

John Edward Nassau Molesworth (1790–1877) was an English cleric of High Church views, vicar of Rochdale for around 38 years.

== Family background ==
The great-grandson of Robert Molesworth, 1st Viscount Molesworth, John Edward Nassau Molesworth was born in London on 4 February 1790, only son of John Molesworth and his wife Frances, daughter of Matthew Hill. He was educated under Alexander Crombie of Greenwich. Matriculating at Trinity College, Oxford in 1808, he graduated B.A. in 1812, M.A. in 1817, and B.D. and D.D. in 1838.

== Career ==
For sixteen years Molesworth was curate of Millbrook, Hampshire. William Howley, approving of Molesworth's first work, presented him in succession to the livings of Wirksworth, Derbyshire (1828), and St. Martin's, Canterbury (1829). He also appointed him one of the Six Preachers at Canterbury; recommended him unsuccessfully for the vicarage of Leeds when Hook was elected, and in 1839 presented him to the vicarage of Minster-in-Thanet.

=== Quakerism ===
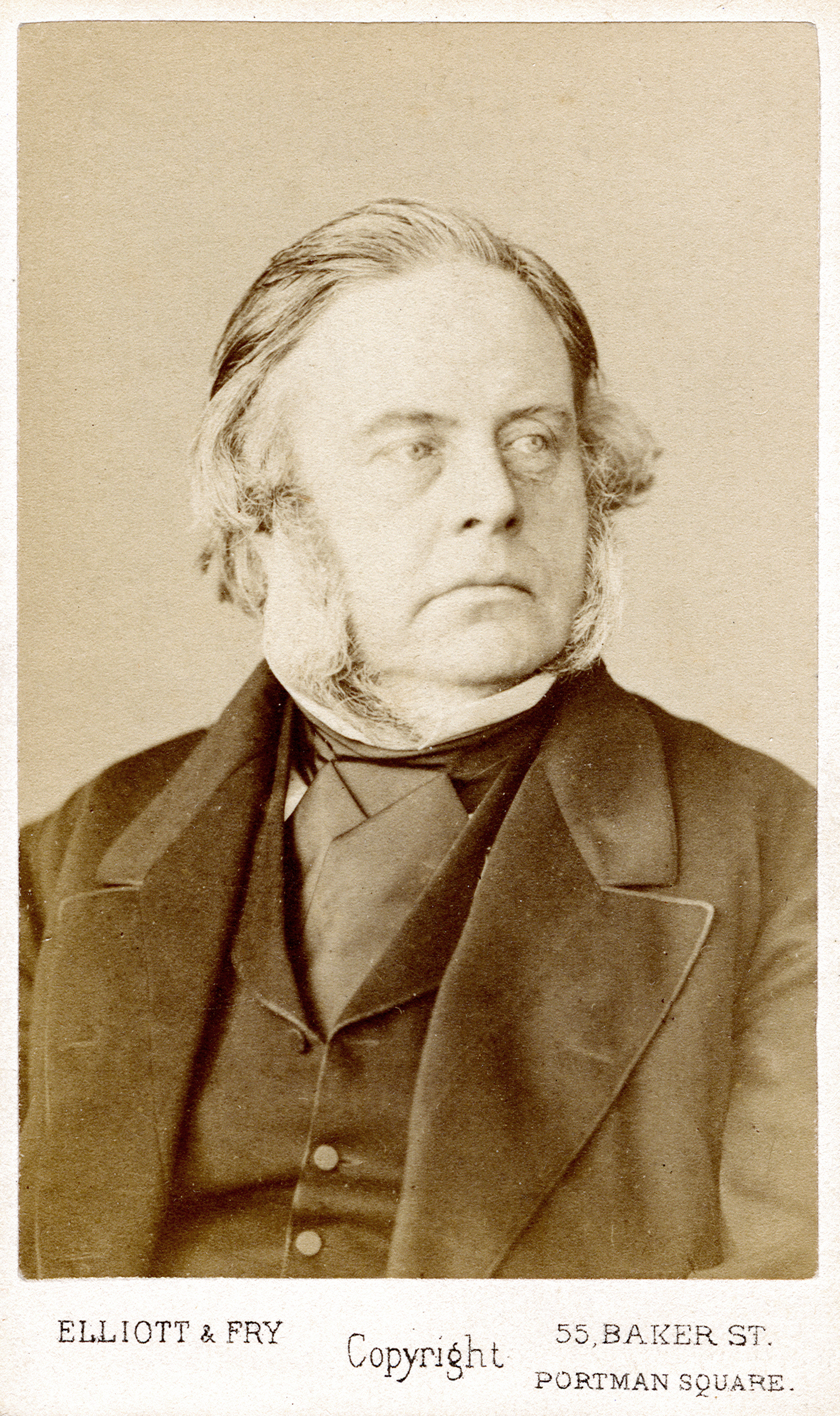
Molesworth's Quaker colleague, John Bright

A few months later (3 March 1840), Howley presented Molesworth to Rochdale. He succeeded the absentee vicar William Robert Hay. Dissenters, led by John Bright—the "daughty quaker leader"—were campaigning for the abolition of church rates. Initially battling Bright, Molesworth would eventually support Quakerism, but had to concede that the rates issue was a lost cause. Bright had commended Molesworth's vigorous and determined fight which was not 'surpassed in any other parish in the kingdom'. Bright was also a friend of Molesworth's son William Nassau Molesworth, the politically radical high churchman. John Molesworth's relentless attack on the church's leaseholders of its property, who were not to build on the land in line with their covenants, resulted in the promotion of church building by matching new funds with those of parishioners. Thus, 'four churches so endowed were added to the existing fourteen'.

Molesworth also rebuilt Rochdale Grammar School and built parish schools. The value of the living increased with the spread of factories over the vicarage estate, the railway station and the canal terminus. In 1866, when his income had reached £5,000, Molesworth promoted the Rochdale Vicarage Act, by which 13 chapels of ease became better-endowed parish churches.

On a number of fronts, Molesworth wrote controversial letters and tracts, and he fell out with James Prince Lee, his bishop. The last years of his life were spent in comparative peace. He died on 21 April 1877, and was buried at St. Martin's, Castleton Moor. His views and character resembled those of Walter Farquhar Hook.

== Works ==
Molesworth wrote a reply to John Davison's Inquiry into the Origin and Intent of Primitive Sacrifice (1826), prompted by Thomas Rennell, Dean of Winchester. At Canterbury, during the period of the Great Reform Bill, his controversial talents were recognised.

Besides sermons and pamphlets, Molesworth published a novel, The Rick-burners. He edited and wrote most of The Penny Sunday Reader for five years. He was a friend of Hugh James Rose, and contributed to The British Magazine and Encyclopaedia Metropolitana, of which Rose was editor.

== Family ==
Molesworth was twice married, firstly in 1825, to Harriet who was both the daughter of W. Mackinnon of Newton Park and the sister of the MP William Alexander Mackinnon and Lieutenant Colonel Daniel Mackinnon. They had six sons and three daughters, among whom were William Nassau Molesworth, engineer Sir Guilford Molesworth and solicitor John Molesworth (died 1886), great-great-grandfather of Sophie, Duchess of Edinburgh. Harriet Molesworth died in 1850.

Secondly, in 1854, Molesworth married Harriett Elizabeth, daughter of the Rev. Sir Robert Affleck, 4th Baronet, and widow of John Thomas Bridges (died 1853), of St. Nicholas Court, Thanet, and Walmer. This second marriage brought Molesworth a further nine children, and he became in particular the step-father of Robert Bridges. It followed the marriage of Molesworth's eldest son, Guilford (died 1925), to Maria Bridges, earlier that year. Robert Bridges did not at first find his step-father easy to relate to, but later found him hospitable to his friend Harry Ellis Wooldridge.

== Notes ==
Attribution

This article incorporates text from a publication now in the public domain: Lee, Sidney, ed. (1894). "Molesworth, John Edward Nassau". Dictionary of National Biography. Vol. 38. London: Smith, Elder & Co.

This article incorporates text from a publication now in the public domain: Hamilton, John Andrew (1894). "Molesworth, William Nassau". In Lee, Sidney (ed.). Dictionary of National Biography. Vol. 38. London: Smith, Elder & Co.
