= Viscount Molesworth =

Title in the peerage of Ireland

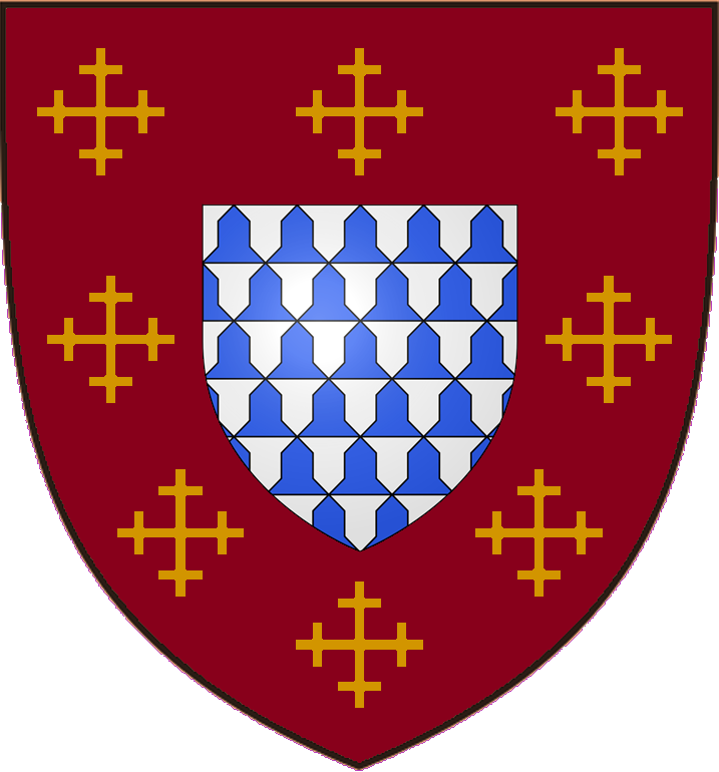
Coat of arms of the Viscount Molesworth

Viscount Molesworth, of Swords in the County of Dublin, is a title in the Peerage of Ireland. It was created in 1716 for Robert Molesworth. He was made Lord Molesworth, Baron of Philipstown, of King's County, at the same time, also in the Peerage of Ireland. Molesworth had been invested as member of the Irish Privy Council in 1697, represented Camelford, Lostwithiel, East Retford and Mitchell in the British House of Commons and served as British Ambassador to Denmark. His elder son, the second Viscount, notably served as Ambassador to the Kingdom of Sardinia, the Grand Duchy of Tuscany and the Republic of Venice. He was succeeded by his younger brother, the third Viscount. He was a Field Marshal in the Army. On the death of his son, the fourth Viscount, this line of the family failed, and the titles passed to the latter's first cousin, the fifth Viscount. He was the eldest son of the Hon. William Molesworth, third son of the first Viscount. His son, the sixth Viscount, was a Major-General in the Army, who was lost in the wreck of Arniston. On his death, this line of the family also failed and the titles were inherited by his second cousin, the seventh Viscount. He was the eldest son of Richard, third son of the Hon. William Molesworth, third son of the first Viscount. He was succeeded by his nephew, the eighth Viscount. As of 2010, the titles are held by the latter's great-grandson, the twelfth Viscount, who succeeded his father in 1997.

Sophie, Duchess of Edinburgh, is a direct descendant of the 1st Viscount through her grandmother, Margaret Patricia Rhys-Jones (née Molesworth; 1904–1985), who was the great-granddaughter of the Rev. John Molesworth, himself the father of Sir Guilford Molesworth and the great-grandson of Robert Molesworth, 1st Viscount Molesworth.

== Viscounts Molesworth (1716) ==
- Robert Molesworth, 1st Viscount Molesworth (1656–1725)
- John Molesworth, 2nd Viscount Molesworth (1679–1726)
- Richard Molesworth, 3rd Viscount Molesworth (1680–1758)
- Richard Nassau Molesworth, 4th Viscount Molesworth (1748–1793)
- Robert Molesworth, 5th Viscount Molesworth (1729–1813)
- William John Molesworth, 6th Viscount Molesworth (1763–1815)
- Richard Pigott Molesworth, 7th Viscount Molesworth (1786–1875)
- Samuel Molesworth, 8th Viscount Molesworth (1829–1906)
- George Bagot Molesworth, 9th Viscount Molesworth (1867–1947)
- Charles Richard Molesworth, 10th Viscount Molesworth (1869–1961)
- Richard Gosset Molesworth, 11th Viscount Molesworth (1907–1997)
- Robert Bysse Kelham Molesworth, 12th Viscount Molesworth (born 1959)

The heir presumptive is the present holder's brother, the Hon. William John Charles Molesworth (born 1960). His heir, and the next in line, is his son James Vladimir Richard Molesworth (born 2010).

=== Male-line family tree ===
Male-line family tree, Viscounts Molesworth.

Robert Molesworth; 1st Viscount Molesworth; 1656–1725
John Molesworth; 2nd Viscount Molesworth; 1679–1726	Richard Molesworth; 3rd Viscount Molesworth; 1680–1758	Capt. William Molesworth a. 1680 – ?
Richard Molesworth; 4th Viscount Molesworth; 1748–1793	Robert Molesworth; 5th Viscount Molesworth; 1729–1813	Richard Molesworth; 1737–1799
William Molesworth; 6th Viscount Molesworth; 1763–1815	Hon. Robert Molesworth; 1768–1814	Richard Molesworth; 7th Viscount Molesworth; 1786–1875	Capt. John Molesworth died 1858
Samuel Molesworth; 8th Viscount Molesworth; 1829–1906
George Molesworth; 9th Viscount Molesworth; 1867–1947	Charles Molesworth; 10th Viscount Molesworth; 1869–1961	Hon. Arthur Molesworth; 1870–1951	Hon. Samuel Molesworth; 1873–1897
Richard Molesworth; 11th Viscount Molesworth; 1907–1997	James Molesworth; 1917–1943	Frank Molesworth; 1911–1999
Robert Molesworth; 12th Viscount Molesworth born 1959	Hon. William Molesworth born 1960
