= Sir Edward Neville of Grove =

Member of the Parliament of England

Edward Neville (1651–1685) was the member of parliament for Retford during the Exclusion Parliament. He represented the borough from 1679–1681 and from 1685–1686.

== Personal life ==
Neville (also spelt Nevill and Nevile) was descended from the Neviles of Lincolnshire, who had settled in Nottinghamshire in the 13th century. He was descended from George Neville of Ragnall and Barbara Hercy (c. 1522-c. 1622) of Grove (daughter of Humphrey Hercy of Grove and Lady Elizabeth Hercy (née Digby)). Sir John Hercy bequeathed Grove Hall to his sister Barbara in 1570.

Edward Neville was the only son of Edward Neville of Grove and his wife Anne, the daughter of Sir Peter Scott. Neville was orphaned at an early age. He inherited Grove along with an income of almost £1,000 a year, as well as his father’s borough seat.

He matriculated from Jesus College, Oxford in 1669 and in the same year (aged 17) he married his guardian's wife and widow, Catherine, daughter of Edward Holte and the sister of Sir Robert Holte. She is said to have influenced Neville to become a royalist. She died in 1683. He then married Elizabeth in 1684 who was the widow of Edmund Bostock.

He was knighted in 1674. He died in 1686 at the age of 34. Grove was sold to Sir Cresswell Levinz, one of the judges of the Common Pleas to settle debts.

== Career ==
Neville was recommended by 1st Duke of Newcastle to the Lieutenancy and to the Commission of the Peace by Lord Halifax (Sir George Savile).

Shaftesbury marked Neville as ‘honest’ in 1679 during the First Exclusion Parliament. But Neville was not well and was given leave to go back to the country to recover his health and so missed the voting on the Exclusion Bill. He did not attend the next election due to illness but was still re-elected uncontested. He was not named to any committees in either the second or third Exclusion Parliaments (to which he was again returned unopposed).

Although never given office, Neville remained loyal to the Court. On 19 February 1685 he carried up the East Retford Charter, which ‘had not been surrendered but by the great loyalty, and prudence and power of Sir Edward Neville’, and was appointed deputy recorder to the 2nd Duke of Newcastle (Henry Cavendish). He was foreman of the grand jury which presented a loyal address to the new King, and was again returned unopposed to James II’s Parliament.

== Gift of ceremonial mace ==
Neville donated a silver ceremonial mace to the Corporation of East Retford to be carried by the senior bailiff. Arthur Kidson reports that Neville "did much for the town". He describes the mace as "Silver gilt, 3 feet 11 3/8 inches long, surmounted by an arched crown with the orb and cross. It is decorated with roses, thistles, lilies, acanthus leaves, etc., and bears the date 1679. There is a copy of this mace in the South Kensington Museum."

The crest of Retford is based upon a design on this mace with a few changes. A small shield replaces the original rose upon which the lion rested its paw and its tail is now forked. The deed stands for the Borough's ancient charters, which date from the thirteenth century onwards.
