= Guilford Lindsey Molesworth =

Sir Guilford Lindsey Molesworth KCIE
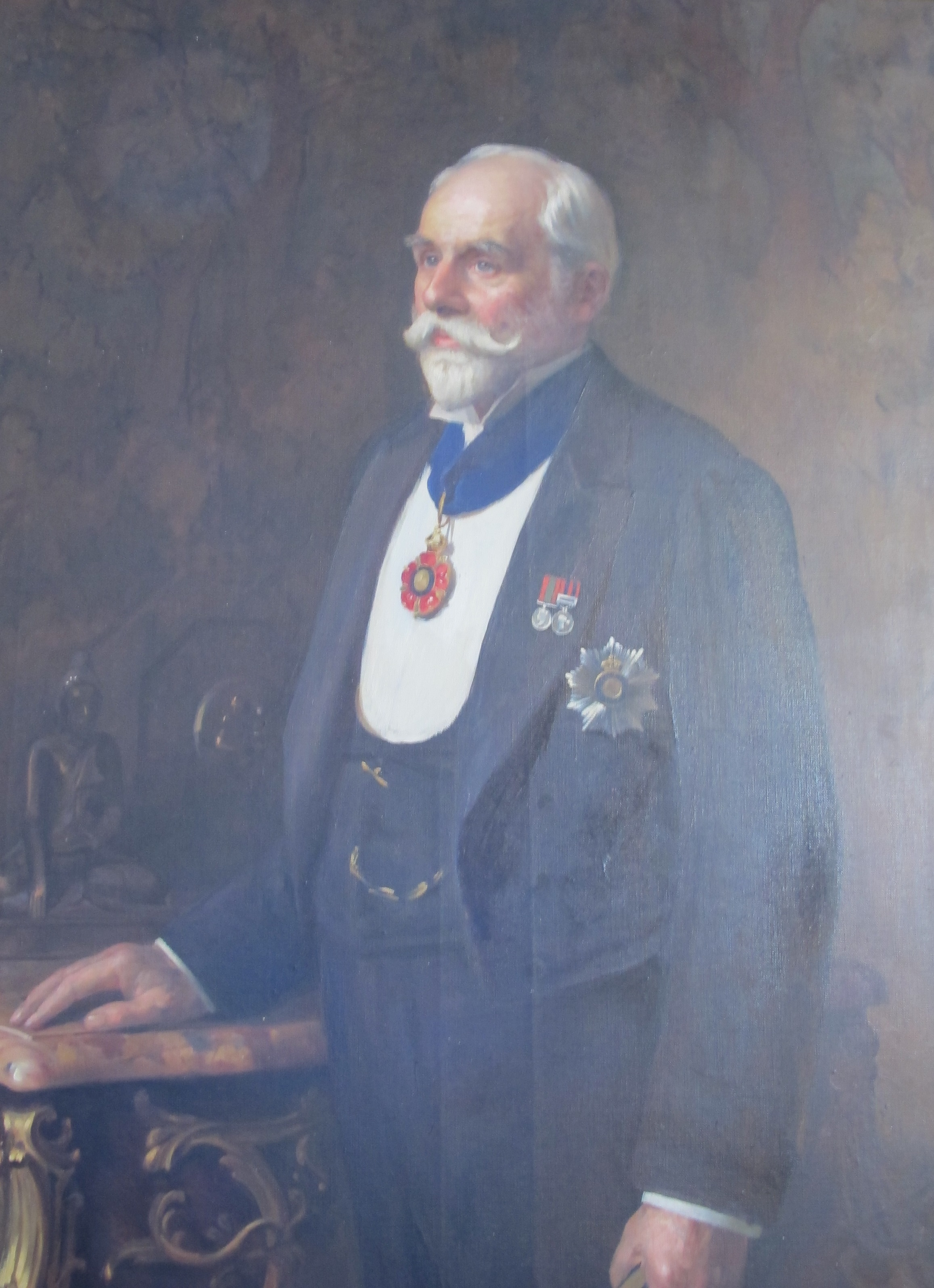
- Portrait by Beatrice Bright
- Born: 1828
- Died: 1925 (aged 96–97)
- Engineering career
- Discipline: Civil engineering
- Institutions: Institution of Civil Engineers (president)
- Projects: Royal Arsenal, Woolwich

Sir Guilford Lindsey Molesworth KCIE (1828–1925) was an English civil engineer.

== Early years and family ==
Molesworth was born in Millbrook, Hampshire, the son of John Edward Nassau Molesworth, Vicar of Rochdale. The elder Molesworth was a great-grandson of Robert Molesworth, 1st Viscount Molesworth. Sir Guildford's great niece was Margaret Patricia Molesworth (1904–1985), the grandmother of Sophie, Duchess of Edinburgh. Molesworth and his four brothers - William, solicitor John, George and Rennell - were educated at the King's School, Canterbury where he found football "a great attraction". He then attended the College for Civil Engineers at Putney, apprenticed under Mr Dockray in the London and North Western Railway, and under Sir William Fairbairn at Manchester.

== Career in England, India and Ceylon ==
He became a chief assistant engineer of the London, Brighton and South Coast Railway, but soon resigned to conduct the constructions at the Royal Arsenal, Woolwich, during the Crimean War. He received the Watt Medal and the Manby premium in 1858 from the Institution of Civil Engineers for his paper on Conversion of Wood by Machinery. He returned to London for a number of years, worked at his profession, then went to Ceylon in 1859 and in 1862 became chief engineer of the government railways in Ceylon. From 1871 to 1889 he lived in India and was consulting engineer to the Indian government with regard to State railways. He was made a Knight Commander of the Order of the Indian Empire (KCIE) by Queen Victoria in 1888, the year she elevated her Indian manservant, Abdul Karim, to the position of Munshi. He received medals from the British Government for his services during the Afghan War and the Burma War, and was president of the Institution of Civil Engineers in 1904.

== Gauge ==
Molesworth was consulted on a number of occasions on the suitability of adopting a narrow gauge rather than a broad one. He was generally against the narrow gauge as he regarded the cost savings as illusory. His broad gauge line to Kandy was meant to prove that the gauge was practicable in steep mountains.

== Bibliography ==
He published the Molesworth's Pocket Book of Engineering Formulae. This useful little volume contained formulas and details on many engineering related subjects. The first edition was published in November 1862 and ran to over thirty editions (The twenty-eighth edition was published in 1921).

His other works include:

- State Railways in India (1872)
- Metrical Tables (1880; fourth edition, 1909)
- Imperialism in India (1885)
- Silver and Gold (1891)
- Our Empire under Protection and Free Trade (1902)
- Economic and Fiscal Facts and Fallacies (1909)
- Indian Railway Policy (1920)

Professional and academic associations
Preceded by William Henry White	President of the Institution of Civil Engineers; November 1904 – November 1905	Succeeded by Alexander Binnie
