= Government Houses of New Zealand =

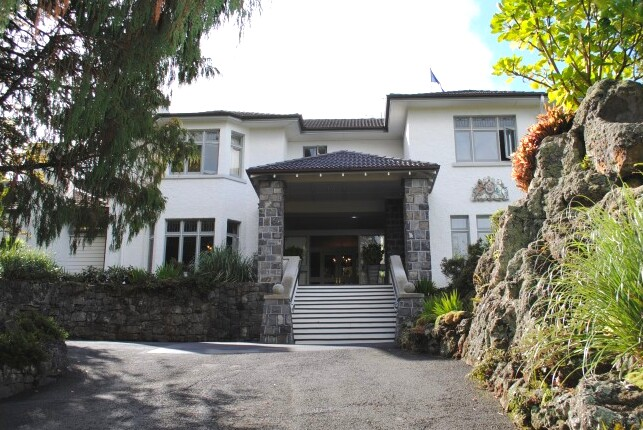
Government House, Auckland

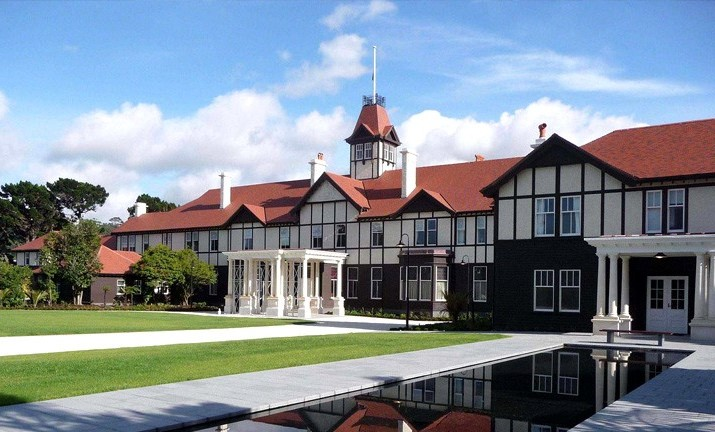
Government House, Wellington

This is a list of Government Houses of New Zealand. The two maintained Government Houses serve as residences for the governor-general, serving as the official place of business for the administration, as well as venues for many receptions and state functions. Sometimes, Government House is used to refer metonymically to the office of governor-general.

== Current ==
- Government House, Auckland, the secondary residence
- Government House, Wellington, the primary residence.

== Former ==
- Old Government House, Auckland. The first Governor's residence burned down in 1848 and was replaced by this building, constructed 1855–56 and at the time the largest residence in New Zealand. It is now occupied by the University of Auckland.
- First Government House, Wellington. Originally Colonel William Wakefield's villa, located where the Beehive now stands. Wakefield was the Agent for the New Zealand Company and had built the house in 1840 but had died in 1848. The residence was then used as a hospital for a short period after the 1848 Marlborough earthquake.
- Second Government House, Wellington. Designed by William Clayton in 1871. After fire destroyed the main parliamentary buildings in 1907 the building was used as the Legislative Chambers, and the governor was moved, temporarily, to Palmerston North before returning to the current Government House in Wellington. Following the completion of the new Parliament House in 1922, the building was used as Bellamy's parliamentary restaurant. Its tower was removed in 1944 because of its earthquake risk, and the remaining structure was demolished in 1969 to make way for the construction of the Beehive.
- Elmwood House, Christchurch. Originally built for Robert Rhodes, the house was destroyed by fire in 1882 and rebuilt in 1884. It was maintained as a residence in the South Island. The house was demolished in 1954 to make way for Heaton Intermediate School.
- Vogel House, Lower Hutt. Used from 2008 to 2012, while Government House, Wellington underwent restoration. Designed by Heathcote Helmore for James Vogel (grandson of former Premier Julius Vogel) in 1933. The property was gifted to the Crown by the Vogels in 1965. Has also served as the official residence of the Prime Minister of New Zealand.

== See also ==
- Government Houses of the British Empire
