= Thomas A. Hunter =

Thomas A. Hunter may refer to:

- Thomas Hunter (psychologist) (1876–1953), New Zealand psychologist, university professor and administrator
- Thomas Hunter (dentist) (1863–1958), New Zealand dentist and public health administrator
