= Government House, Wellington =

Official residence of the Governor-General of New Zealand

Government House
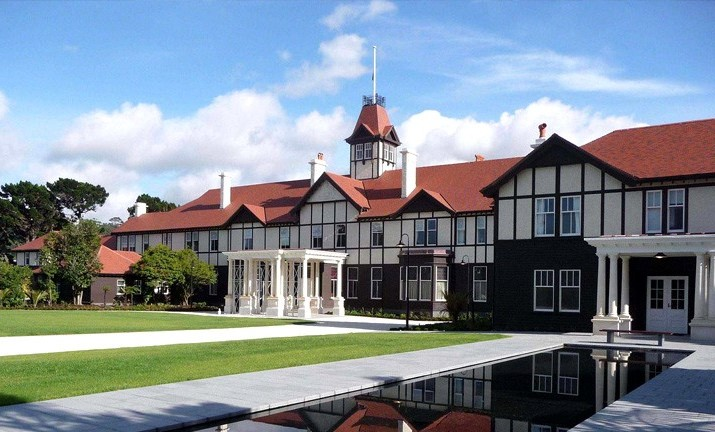
- South entrance of Government House, 2017

General information
- Architectural style: Edwardian
- Location: Wellington, New Zealand
- Coordinates: 41.306114°S 174.7810835°E
- Current tenants: Governor-General of New Zealand
- Construction started: 1908
- Completed: 1910

Technical details
- Floor area: 4,200 square metres (45,000 ft^{2})

Design and construction
- Architects: Claude Paton in the office of John Campbell, Government Architect

Website
- Official website

Heritage New Zealand – Category 1
- Designated: 25 November 1982
- Reference no.: 218

Government House is the principal residence of the governor-general of New Zealand, the representative of the New Zealand head of state, King Charles III. Dame Cindy Kiro, who has been Governor-General since October 2021, currently resides there with her spouse, Richard Davies. The present building, the third Government House in Wellington, was completed in 1910, and is located in the suburb of Newtown.

As well as being an official residence and workplace, Government House is also the main venue where the governor-general entertains members of the public, and receives visiting heads of state and other dignitaries and the credentials of ambassadors to New Zealand. Government House is likewise the location of many award presentations and investitures, and where prime ministers and other ministers of the Crown are sworn in, among other ceremonial and constitutional functions.

Members of the royal family stay at Government House when on official visits to New Zealand.

== History ==
=== First Government Houses ===
When Auckland was the capital of New Zealand from 1841 until 1865, the provision of an official residence for the governor was initially not a priority. It was only during the period of the fourth governor, George Grey, that an official property was provided. The first Wellington Government House was Colonel William Wakefield's villa, located where the Beehive now stands. Wakefield was the agent for the New Zealand Company; he had built the house in 1840, but died in 1848. The residence was then used as a hospital for a short period in 1848 after the Marlborough earthquake. Wakefield's house was a very plain Regency styled building with verandahs, it stood on a hill overlooking the harbour. There is a record of the first Government House Ball being held in it, on 10 February 1849 during George Grey's first period as governor.

Grey was succeeded by Robert Wynyard, then by Thomas Gore Browne (and then Wynyard again). It is possible that neither of these men visited or resided in Wellington during their terms and thus the official status of the Wakefield Villa is uncertain. Grey became governor for a second time in 1861 and he certainly used Wakefield House as his Official Wellington Residence.

=== Second Government House ===
In 1865 the capital was transferred from Auckland to Wellington. The need to provide accommodation for the various branches of Government resulted in a flurry of construction and prompted the replacement of the rather plain Government House with a more appropriate building. Planning began in 1868 and initially it was suggested that the new Government House should be in a similar neo-Gothic style. In the end an Italianate style was chosen, at least partly because it was a cheaper option.

Despite being built of wood, the second Government House was an imposing structure distinguished by a tower. It was one of several mid-century houses influenced by Queen Victoria's Osbourne House. Designed by William Henry Clayton (1823–1877) and completed around 1871 the second Government House commanded expansive views over the city and harbour and provided a picturesque contrast with the adjacent Gothic styled Parliament Building complex. Its first occupant was Sir George Ferguson Bowen in 1873.

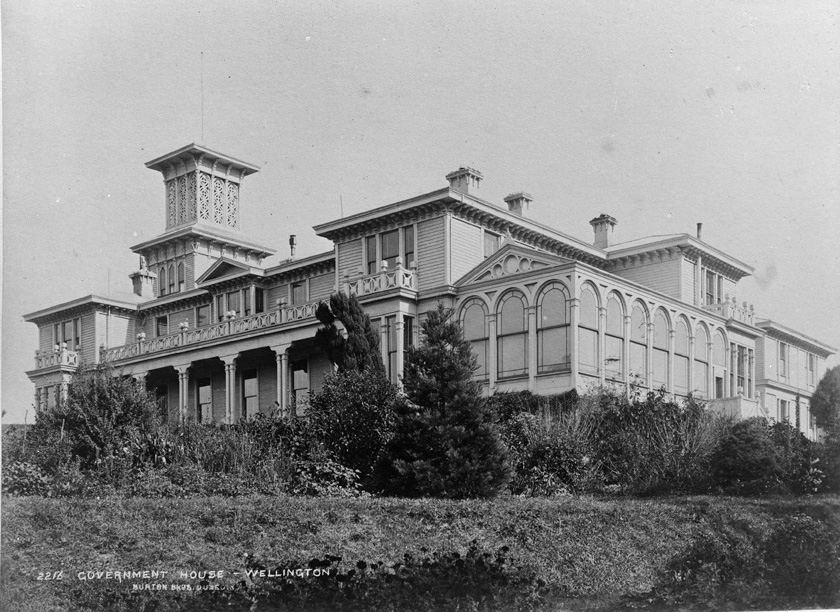
Exterior facade of the second Government House, 1882

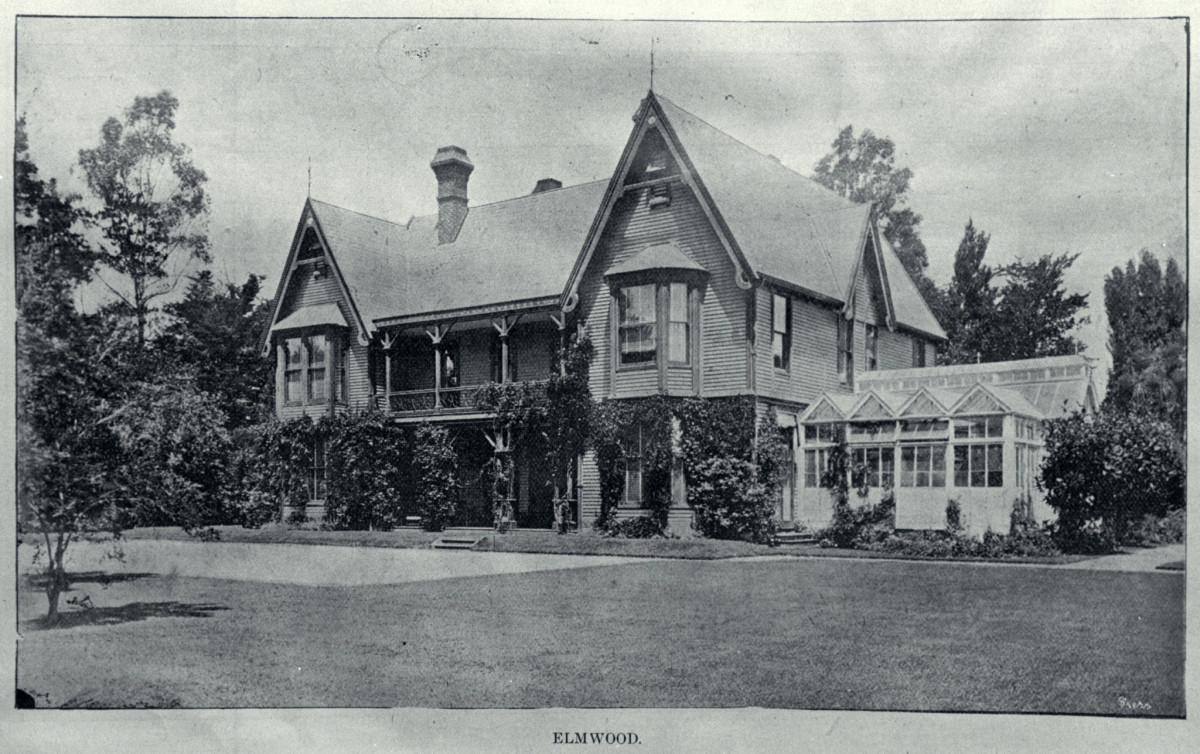
Elmwood House, Christchurch. Used as a residence for the Governors-General in the South Island.

All the succeeding governors resided in the new Clayton building, from Sir James Fergusson to Lord Plunket from 1904. The social climate of the late 19th century required the governor to spend part of the year in other areas of the country – predominately Auckland, although for a while a third Government House, Elmwood House, was maintained in Christchurch. This pattern doubtless lent longevity to the fabric and decoration of each of the official residences, but relatively little furniture and other items were provided by the government — each successive governor had to provide his household with furniture, linen, china etc. from his own pocket (today the pattern is quite different — with each new incumbent only being required to provide personal items). During its 34-year career as Government House the Clayton building was redecorated and added to but it entered the 20th century largely unaltered.

Following the fire in the wooden Parliament Buildings in 1907, the then Governor-General Lord Plunket offered the use of Government House to house both houses of Parliament until a replacement building could be built. In the interim the Plunkets decamped to Palmerston North between 1908 and 1910 where they resided in a house now called Caccia-Birch. Plunket had been lobbying for a larger and more up-to-date residence to be provided by the Government, hopefully more distant from Parliament and with more private grounds.

Following the completion of the new Legislative Chamber in 1922, the former Government House continued to be used as Bellamy's, the parliamentary restaurant. Its tower was removed in 1944 because of concerns about its earthquake risk, and the remaining structure was demolished in 1969 to make way for the construction of the Beehive.

=== Third Government House ===
The Parliament Building fire nudged the government into commissioning a new Government House to be built. The site of the former Mount View Lunatic Asylum, on the lower slopes of Mount Victoria, was selected for the new vice-regal residence. The building was designed by Claude E. Paton of the Government Architect's Office.

John Dickson-Poynder, 1st Baron Islington was the first governor-general to occupy in Government House, residing there from 1910 to 1912.

Government House closed in October 2008 for a major NZ$44 million conservation and rebuilding project, and was reopened in March 2011. During the refurbishment the governor-general lived at Vogel House in Lower Hutt while in Wellington.

== Grounds ==
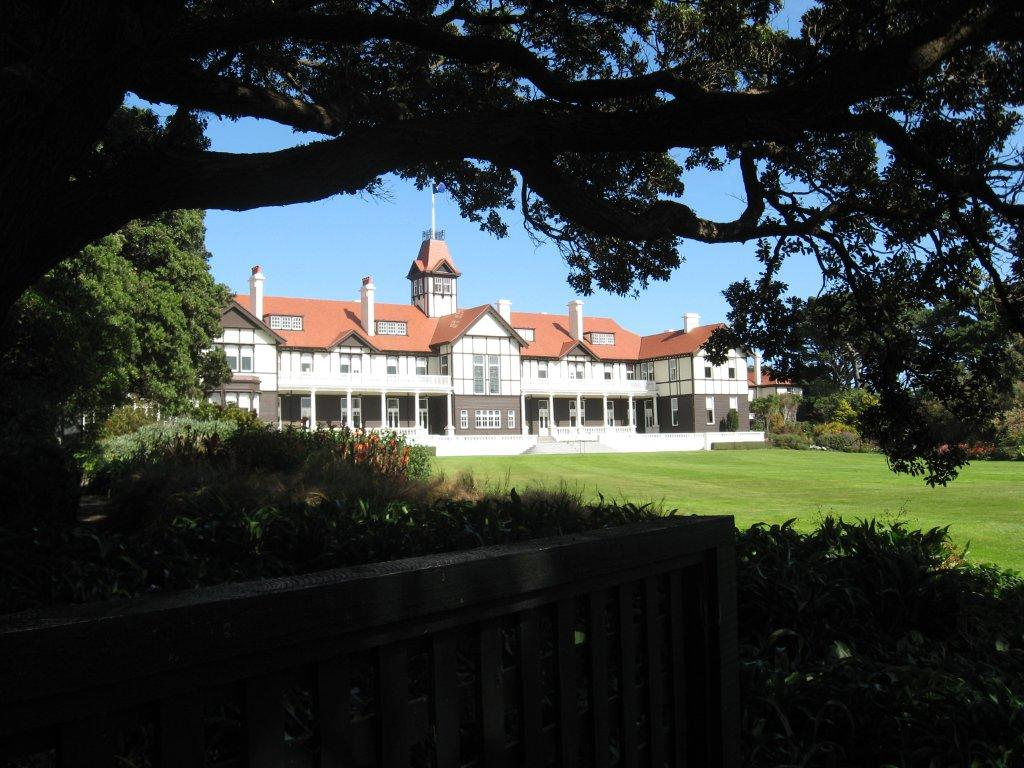
North side

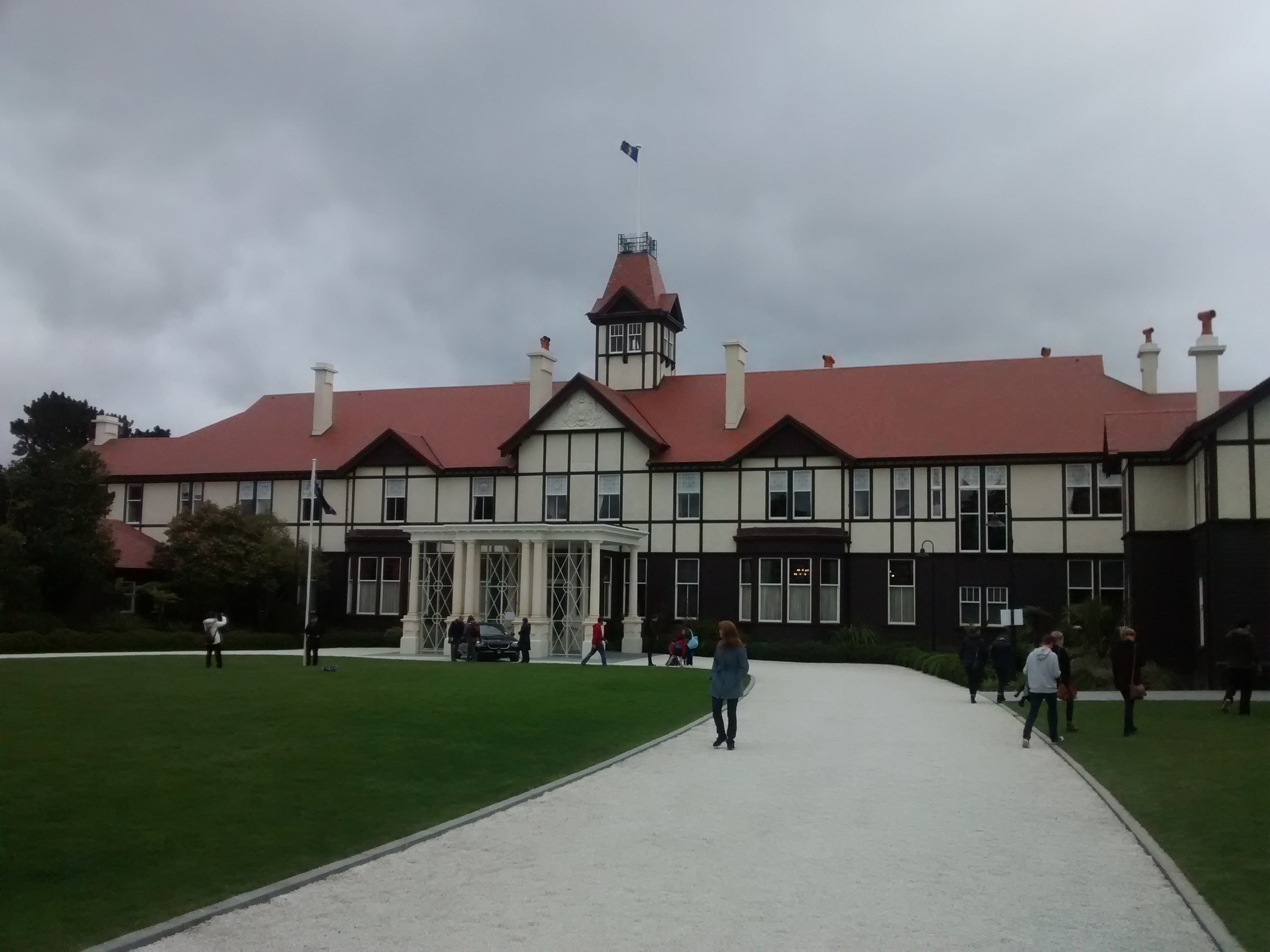
South side

Gardens and manicured lawns front the north and south entrances of the residence.

The house's grounds are much more private than the previous residence, totalling 12 hectares (30 acres). On one side the gardens border Alexandra Park and the Mt Victoria Town Belt giving the impression of even greater expansiveness. The scale of the ground has allowed a range of different landscapes to be developed: rockeries, flower gardens, lawn areas, and a collection of mature trees. A five-year garden redevelopment programme began in 1996, building on the garden's historic design. The gardens combine native New Zealand and exotic plants, reflecting both the Governor-General's New Zealand role and the traditions of formal English gardens. All this contributes to it now being considered a garden of national significance.

The extensive grounds also contain tennis and squash courts, a bomb shelter, four cottages and a visitor centre.

=== Residence ===
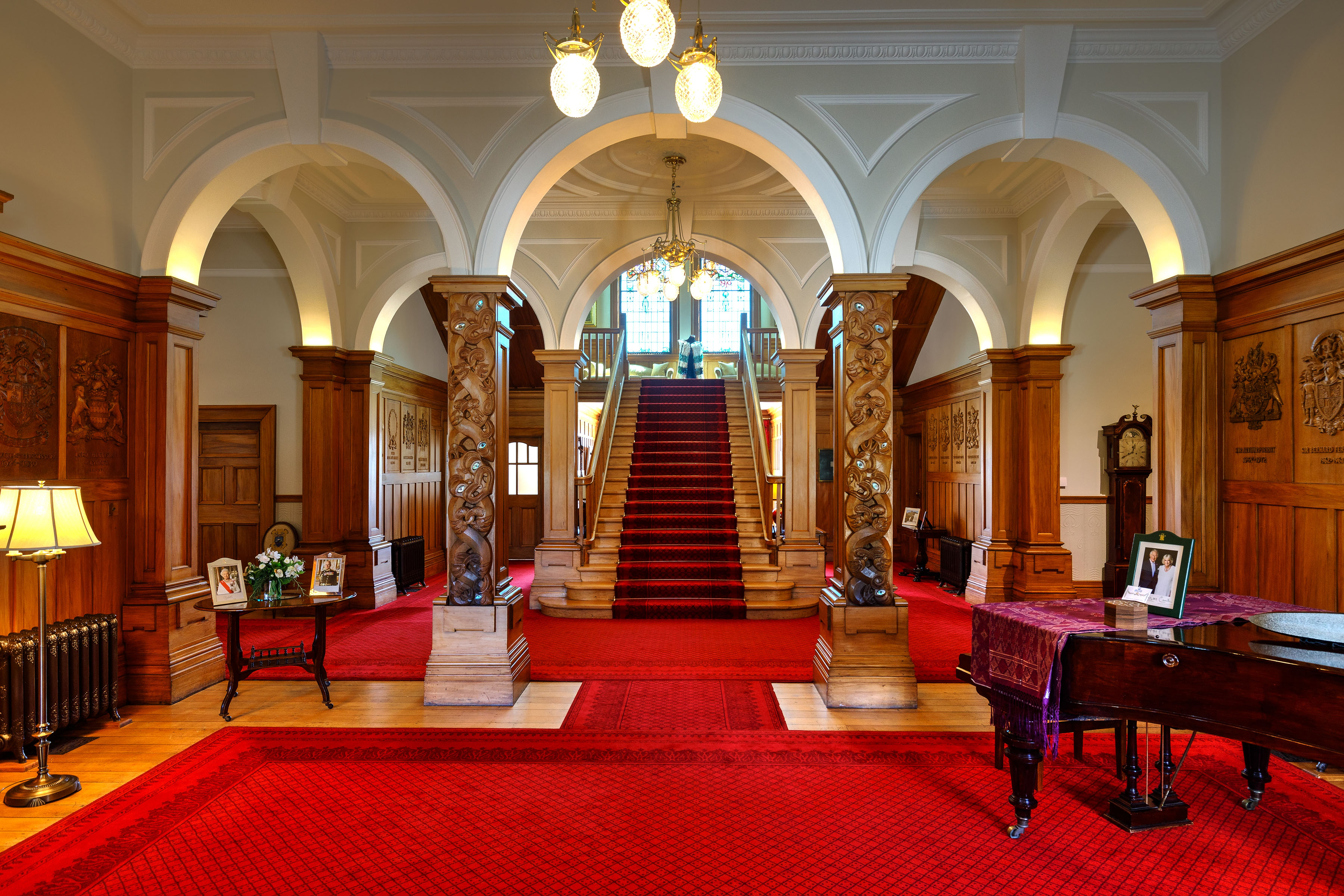
Entrance hall of the residence, with parquet floors and oak panellings used prominently throughout.

The current residence, in Newtown, was designed in an eclectic style in the manner of a half-timbered Tudor mansion. As it was intended to evoke a large English country house, the house's rooms were designed in a range of styles—from Elizabethan to Tudor, to Georgian and Regency. Throughout the house are examples of what was considered good taste at the time: marble fireplaces, parquet floors, oak panelling, Mahogany doors, leadlight windows, bronze electric light fixtures and neo-Georgian plasterwork ceilings. Various portraits of successive governors and other significant people are displayed along with a collection of New Zealand art, some of which has been donated by previous governors. The house covers 4,200 m^{2} (45,000 sq ft).

Many of the rooms are set aside for official state occasions—for example, two dining rooms, a ballroom, a conservatory and drawing rooms. Government House is where the governor-general confers with the leader of the New Zealand Government, hosts foreign dignitaries, and performs the functions of New Zealand's head of state, as the representative of the monarch of New Zealand. The residence is also open to the public, running free tours of the state rooms throughout the year.

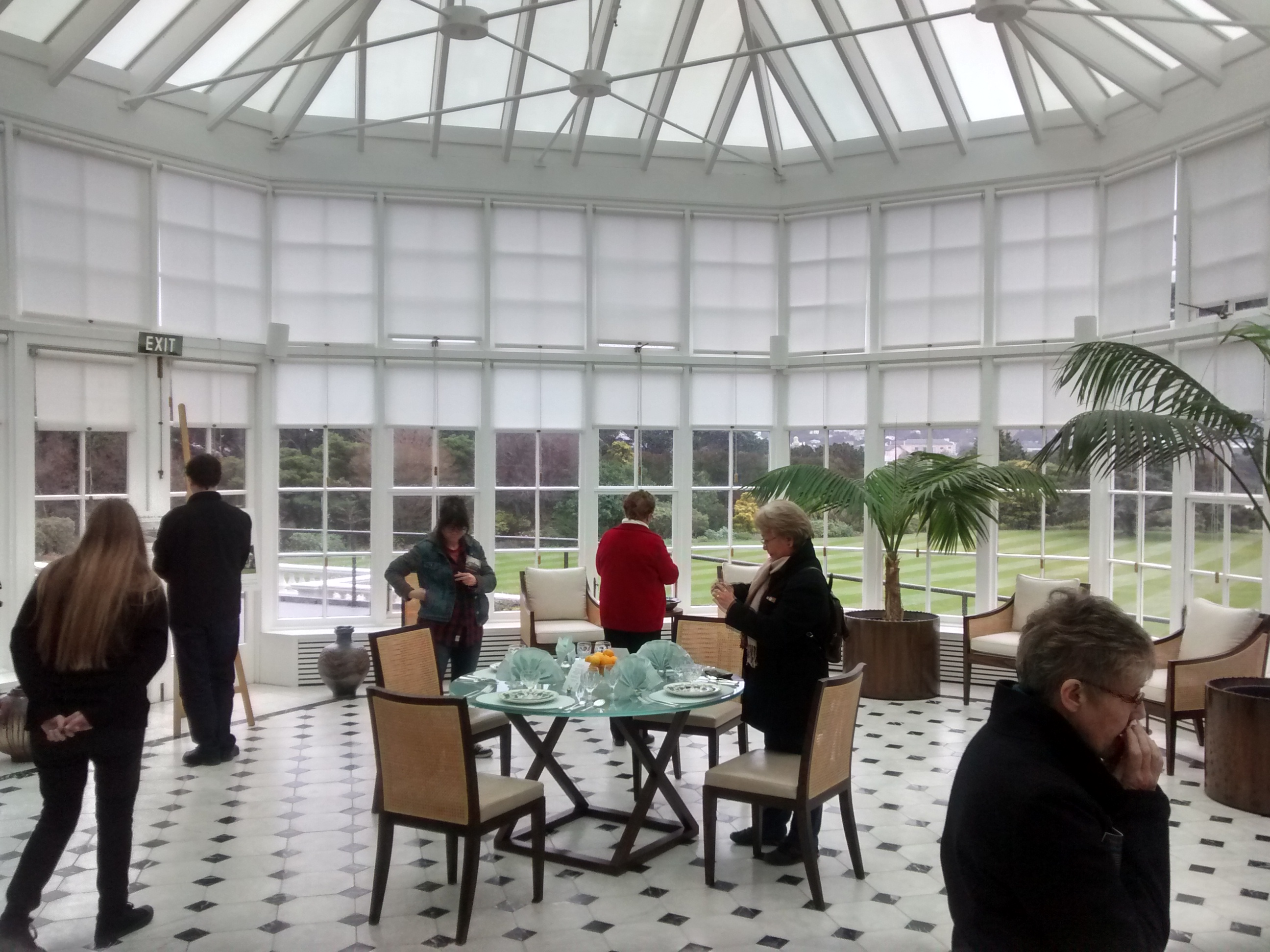
Conservatory

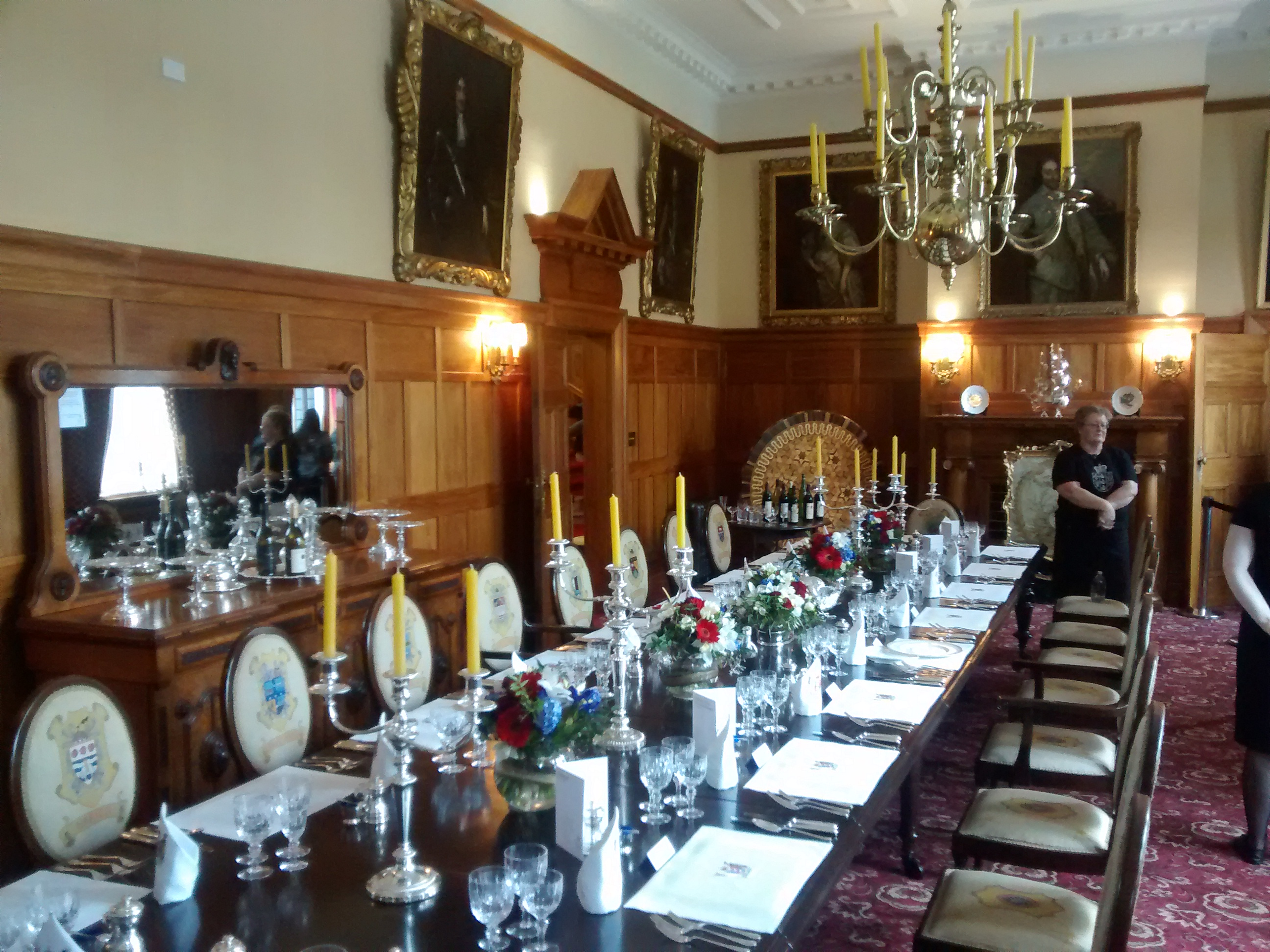
Dining room

State and official events are typically held in either the conservatory, or the dining room

As a result of renovations undertaken in the early 2000s, new carpets were provided for the public reception rooms. The carpets and rugs were designed by several New Zealand artists; Gavin Chilcott, Andrew McLeod, Tim Main and John Bevan Ford. The weaving was done by the carpet manufacturer Dilana, in association with Athfield Architects. The design of the drawing room carpet by Gavin Chilcott is derived from the silver fern. Of particular interest is the spectacular kowhaiwhai pattern, composed into a huge single composition 4 metres (13 ft) x without a repeat, was designed by Andrew McLeod and inspired by Theo Schoon's drawings of Māori designs. This pattern was produced in three different colour-ways and appears in several of the reception rooms.

== See also ==
- Government Houses of New Zealand
- Government Houses of the British Empire and Commonwealth
