= Old Government House, Auckland =

Former residence of New Zealand's governor

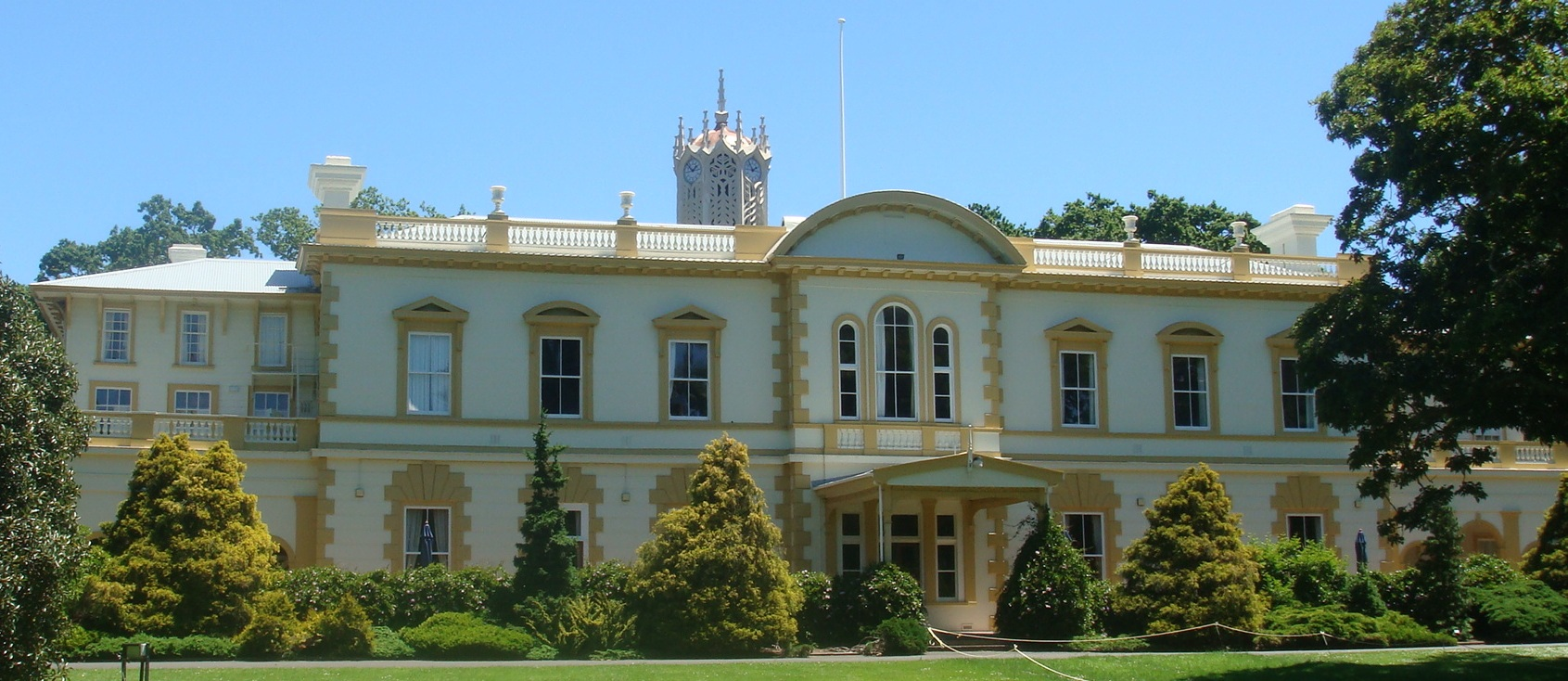
- Old Government House in 2008
- Interactive map of the Old Government House, Auckland area

General information
- Architectural style: Italianate architecture
- Location: Waterloo Quadrant, Auckland, New Zealand
- Coordinates: 36.84988°S 174.77042°E
- Current tenants: University of Auckland
- Completed: 1856

Design and construction
- Architect: William Mason

Heritage New Zealand – Category 1
- Designated: 24 November 1983
- Reference no.: 105

References
- "Government House (Former)". New Zealand Heritage List/Rārangi Kōrero. Heritage New Zealand.

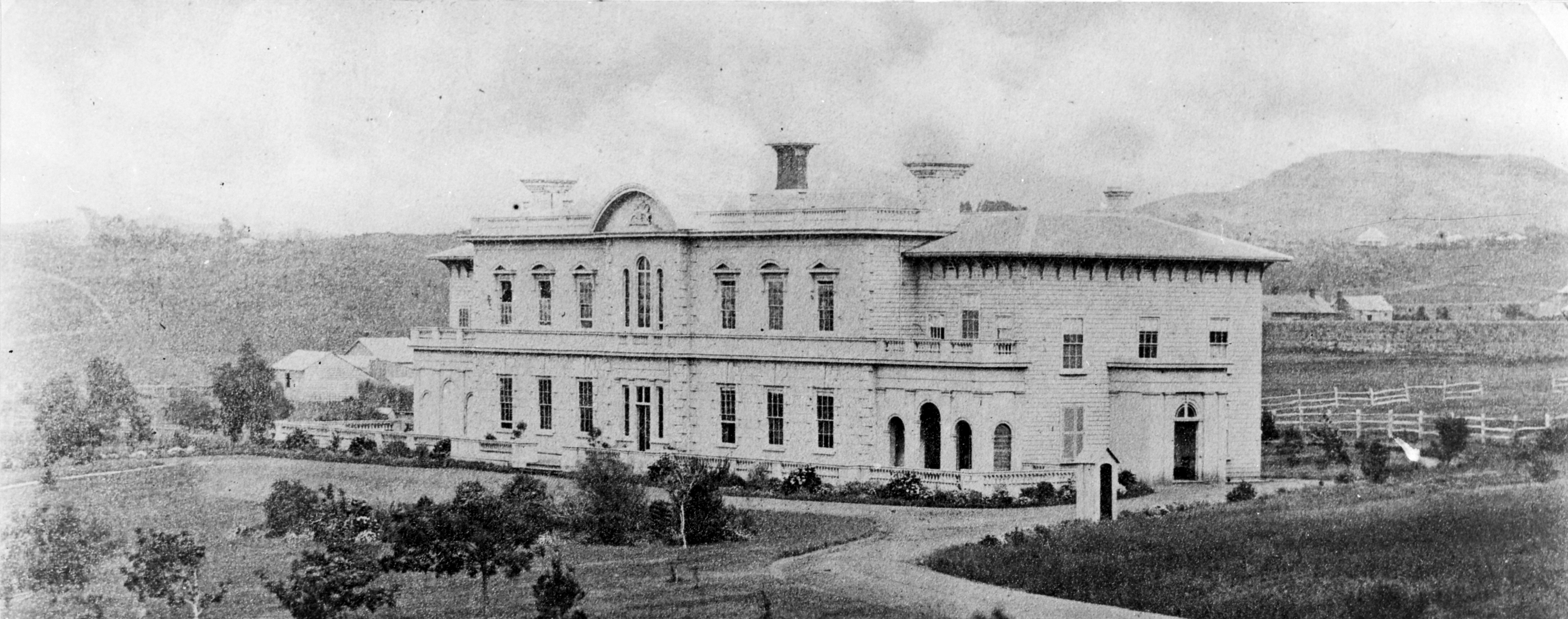
Old Government House in the 1860s

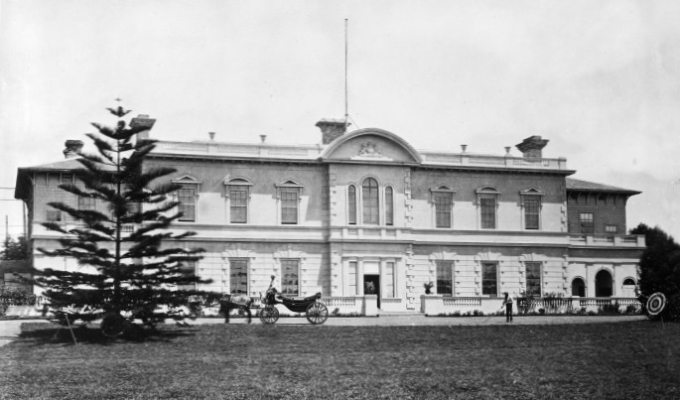
Old Government House in the 1880s

Old Government House is the former residence of the governor of New Zealand in Auckland, New Zealand, listed by Heritage New Zealand as a Category I Historic Place.

== History ==
=== Origins ===
The present building is the second Government House on this site. The first one was a prefabricated wooden structure manufactured by Mannings of London, a firm which specialised in such structures. Apparently the Auckland house supplied to the first governor of New Zealand was similar to the one sent to Saint Helena to house Napoleon (although he refused to move into it). Built for William Hobson, the first governor, the Auckland House caught fire in 1848 during the governorship of Sir George Grey and he and successive governors occupied rented houses until the current structure was built; these included Scoria House on Karangahape Road (later called St Kevins) and Hulme court in Parnell.

The current building was designed by William Mason, and was completed in 1856 as one of the measures taken by Auckland to retain its status as New Zealand's capital. However, the house was used only sporadically after the seat of government was moved to Wellington in 1865. The wooden Italianate mansion endured criticism from architects and lay people alike, many disliked the flat, pasteboard effect of the façade and the dishonest imitation of stone masonry in wood.

In the 1860s Governor Gore Browne lobbied for a new residence to be built in the nearby Auckland Domain. The intended building (possibly by Rumsey) was a stone Gothic castellated residence strongly resembling the one in Sydney. This sparked criticism partly because of what was perceived as extravagance but also because it would allow part of the Auckland Domain to be alienated from public use. There was also the possibility of the capital being relocated to Wellington which would make an Auckland Government House unnecessary. For these reasons the Weld administration refused funds for such a structure.

=== Move to Wellington ===
The capital was relocated to Wellington in 1864 but Auckland wielded considerable clout and the Government found itself maintaining two residences for the governor. Having more than one Government House in a country as small as New Zealand doubtless seemed extravagant but the governor general continues to this day to alternate between Wellington and Auckland. There were even other vice-regal residences for a while: Christchurch and a temporary one at Palmerston North. The house in Christchurch was called Elmwood, was owned by Sir Heaton Rhodes and was in use during the time of Lord Ranfurly. The Palmerston North House, now called Caccia-Birch, was where Lord Plunket moved to after the disastrous fire in 1907 which gutted the Parliament Buildings. Lord Plunket lent the vice-regal residence in Wellington for Parliament to meet in (he had been lobbying for a larger Government House to be provided in any case). The Palmerston North House was the residence of the governor general between 1908 and 1910 while the new Wellington Government House was under construction.

In 1865, a ballroom was added to the building, to accommodate the intended visit of Alfred, Duke of Edinburgh, who was unable to come to New Zealand due to the assassination attempt on his life in Sydney in 1868. Alfred visited New Zealand the following year.

Queen Elizabeth II and Prince Philip at Auckland Government House, 23 December 1953

Royalty have stayed at the house six times, and Queen Elizabeth II broadcast her Christmas speech from the House in 1953. Old Government House was registered by the New Zealand Historic Places Trust as a Category I heritage structure on 24 November 1983.

=== University of Auckland ===
The Auckland House felt more and more hemmed in as the 20th century progressed especially after apartment blocks began to appear on Waterloo Quadrant. In 1969, Sir Frank and Lady Mappin donated the current Government House (Birchlands) which is located in Mount Eden. In the same year, Old Government House in Waterloo Quadrant became formally part of the University of Auckland. The interior has been rationalised and altered over the years and although much original detailing remains in the main rooms the atmosphere of a palatial residence is conspicuously absent. All the spaces are fairly institutional in manner although the main rooms are decorated with a selection from the university's collection of New Zealand art. Various parts of the building are used as the Staff Common Room, Council reception suite, flats for visiting academics, rooms for the Federation of Graduate Women, while the former ballroom is a lecture theatre.

Various events continue to be held on the front lawn continuing the tradition of vice-regal garden parties. The garden contains many specimen trees planted by visiting dignitaries and governors, in particular George Grey. There is also a rose garden which was planted and tended by successive governors' wives. The site of the former Governor's Stable block was replaced in the 1960s by the Biology Department which is screened from the main, while the adjacent greenhouse complex and tennis courts have likewise been replaced by university buildings.

== See also ==
- Government Houses of New Zealand
- Government Houses of the British Empire and Commonwealth
- Governor-General of New Zealand
