= Walter Dyer (chairperson) =

Australian-born New Zealand board member and chairperson

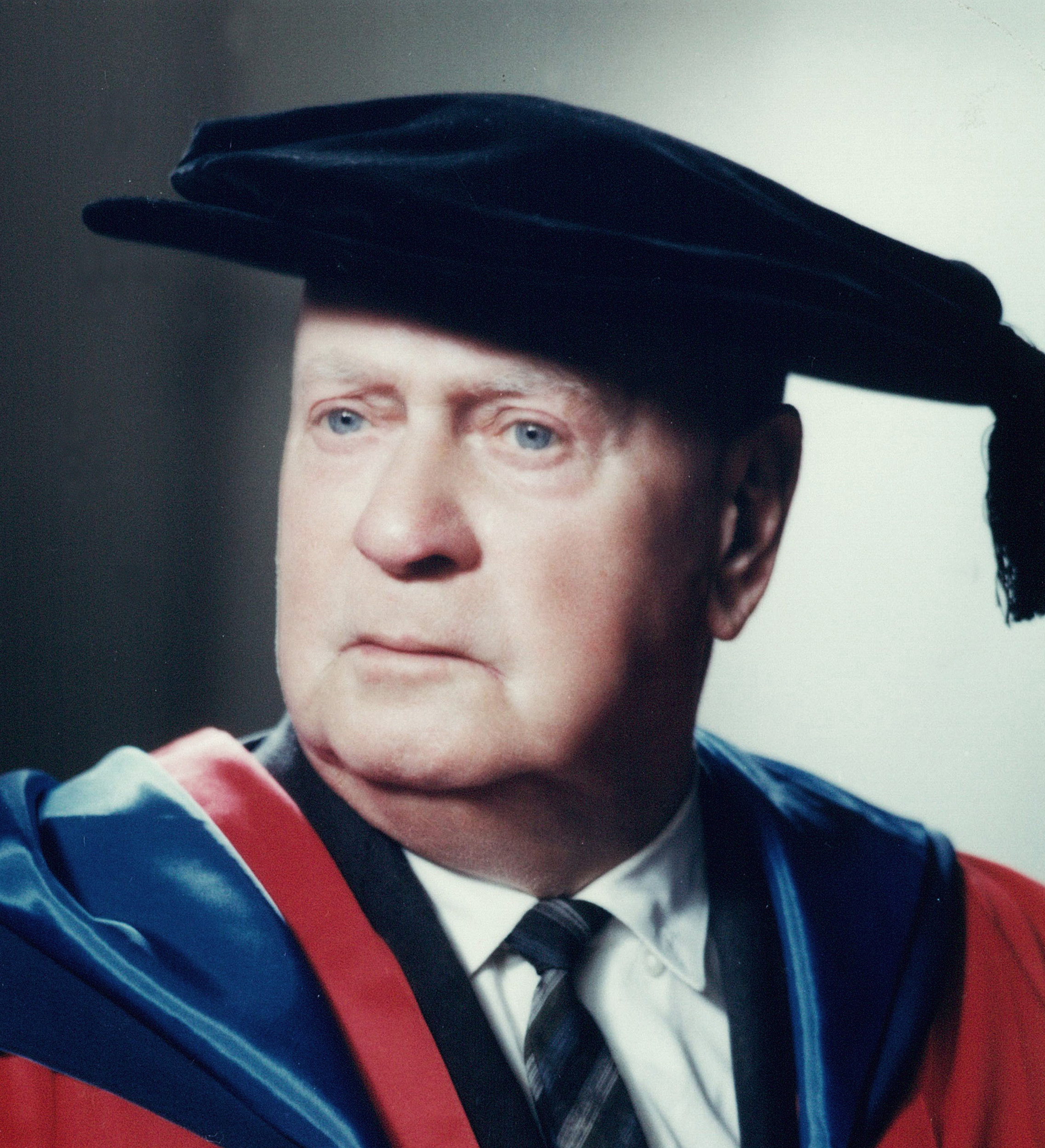
Dyer circa 1960s

Walter Verran Dyer CBE (18 June 1882 – 2 September 1965) was an Australian-born New Zealand board member and chairperson of many education organisations. A carpenter by trade, he built the Category I-listed Vogel House in Lower Hutt.

== Early life ==
Dyer was born in Kapunda, South Australia, in 1882. He had seven elder siblings. On 1 August 1907, he married Alice Jenkins at Thorndon. Dyer was a carpenter by trade and was a partner with Dyer and Halse in Lower Hutt. The company built Vogel House in Lower Hutt in 1933.

== Public service ==
Dyer was chairman of the Hutt School committee and chairman of the Hutt dental clinic. He was a member of Hutt County for nine years where he represented the Epuni riding, first elected during the 1920s. In September 1928, he consented to be a candidate in the Otaki electorate for the United Party in the 1928 general election. He stood down for health reasons a fortnight later and was replaced as a candidate by Archie Sievwright.

Dyer was on the Wellington Education Board for 16 years and for 9 years was the board's chairman; he retired from that board in 1946. From 1939 to 1951, he was on the board of Victoria University College and for some time held the role of deputy chairman. He was on the board of Massey Agricultural College and was Chairmen of the Board of Governors from 1947 to 1959. Dyer was on the board of Wellington College and for some years chaired that board. Other education board positions held by Dyer included Hutt Valley School and Hutt Valley Memorial Technical College.

== Awards ==
In the 1947 Birthday Honours, Dyer was appointed as an Officer of the Order of the British Empire (OBE). In the 1959 Birthday Honours, his appointment was upgraded to the class of Commander "for services to education". In 1964, Dyer was one of the three inaugural recipients of an honorary doctorate from Massey University; he was awarded a D.Sc. Dyer Street in the Lower Hutt suburb of Epuni was named after him as was Walter Dyer Hall, one of the largest student hostels located on Massey University's Palmerston North campus.

== Death ==
Dyer died on 2 September 1965 at Lower Hutt Hospital. He is buried at Taita Cemetery.
