= Government House, Auckland =

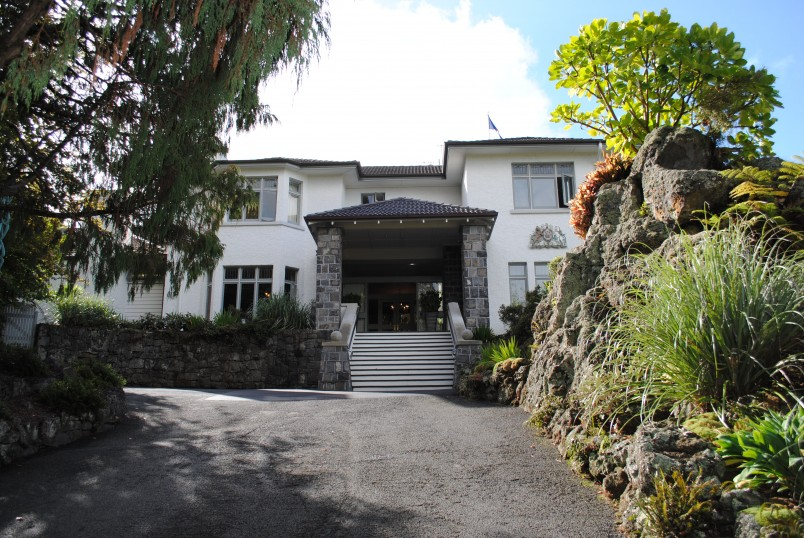
- Exterior facade of Government House

General information
- Location: Auckland, New Zealand
- Coordinates: 36.875318°S 174.768239°E
- Completed: c. 1920s

Website
- gg.govt.nz/government-house/government-house-auckland

Government House, Auckland is the secondary official residence of the governor-general of New Zealand located in Auckland, New Zealand. The property is situated in the Auckland suburb of Mount Eden on Mountain Road.

The building was erected in the 1920s as a private residence for Frank Mappin. Its construction required the demolition of another structure from the late-19th century. The Mappin family continued to own the residence until 1962, when they gave it to the Crown. The property has served as the official residence of the governor-general since 1969, following the departure of the Mappin family from property.

Government House, Auckland is the not the first property to serve as viceregal official residence in Auckland. The first Government House built in Auckland was completed in 1841, and was used as the residence for the governor of New Zealand until it burned down in 1848. Several other residences in Auckland were used to house the governor before Old Government House was completed in 1856. The present Government House replaced Old Government House as the governor-general's residence in Auckland in 1969.

== History ==
=== Earlier Government Houses ===
The first Government House of Auckland was a prefabricated structure brought out by William Hobson in 1841. It was erected in Waterloo Quadrant and burned down in 1848 during George Grey's first period as governor. The decision to rebuild was delayed, probably due to the possibility of the capital being moved to Wellington (which is what transpired in 1864). During the interim period other houses acted as Government House; the Nathan Residence on Karangahape Road, Colonel Wynyard's house in Official Bay and Hulme Court in Parnell.

The replacement Government House by William Mason was not completed until 1856. It served as the Governor's Auckland residence until 1969, when it was superseded by Birchlands in Mount Eden. Now known as Old Government House, the 1856 Italianate Mansion is now part of the University of Auckland City Campus and has been converted into lecture theatres and a common room for faculty. As of 2014 the building was in a poor state of repair.

=== Present Government House ===
==== Private residence ====
The site was probably first built upon in the 1880s or 1890s, although some of the trees may be slightly older, dating from the 1870s. Sir Frank Mappin, 6th Baronet and his wife Lady Mappin bought the Mount Eden property in 1921. They replaced the existing 19th century house completely, and spent the next 45 years developing and landscaping the grounds. They called the house Birchlands after a previous residence in Britain.

The Mappins decided to present the residence to the Crown to act as the new Government House. The recent Royal Tour in 1953 had highlighted many deficiencies in the Waterloo Quadrant building; the mid-Victorian structure was showing its age, and it felt increasingly hemmed in by the growing city and University and thus a possible security risk.

==== Acquisition by the Crown ====
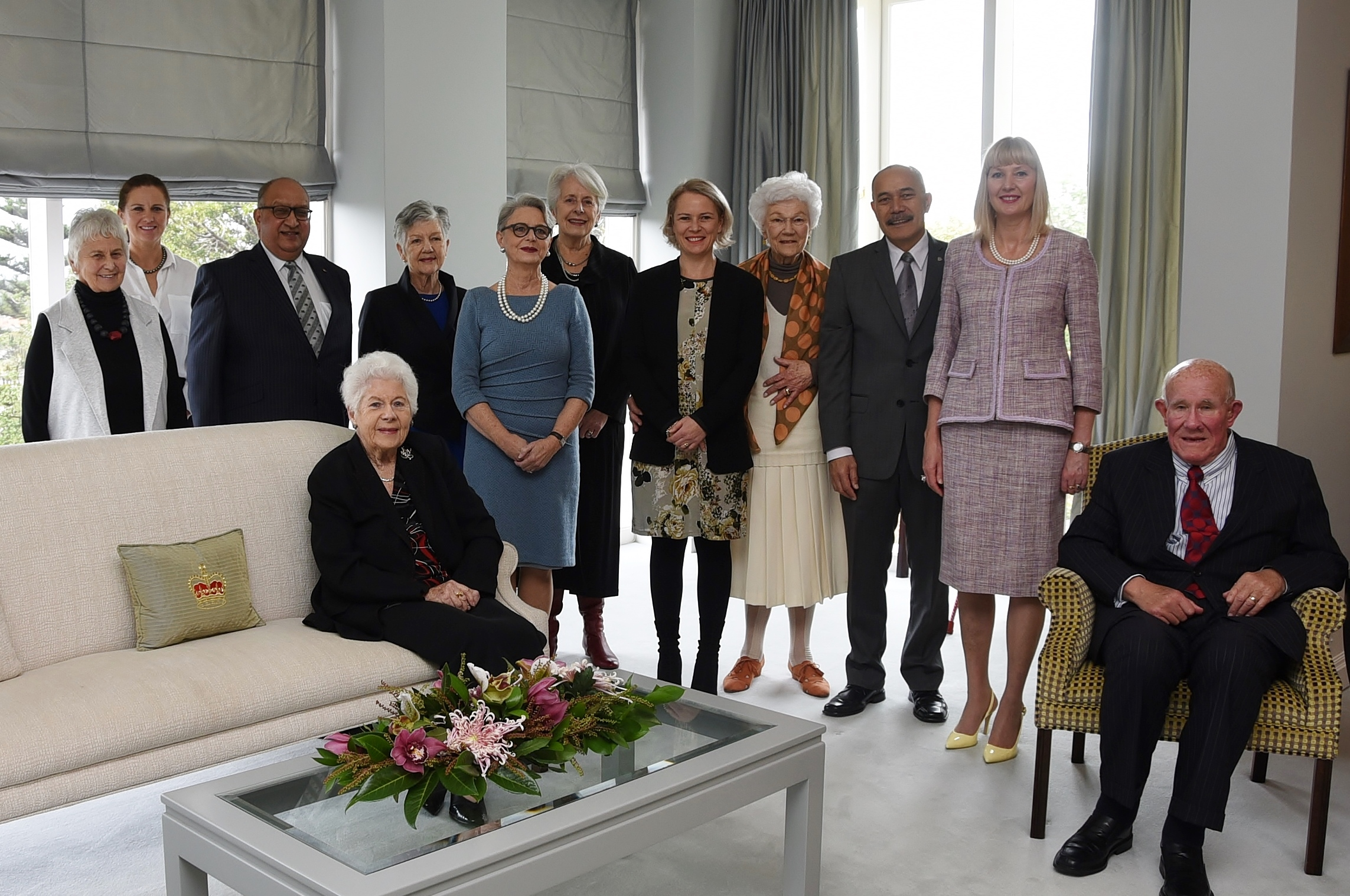
Former governors-general of New Zealand at Government House, July 2016

The Mount Eden property was given to the Crown in 1962, although the Mappins did not depart until 1969. The deed of gift, signed by Sir Frank, and Prime Minister Keith Holyoake on 23 May that year declares that "the donor [was] moved by his duty and loyalty to Her Majesty and by a desire to benefit her present and future subjects in New Zealand by the provision of a site of dignity and beauty for the residence in Auckland for Her Majesty's Representative in New Zealand". The deed states the property is given "upon trust for Her Majesty her heirs and successors according to law as a site for Government House in Auckland for ever ..". Republican Brian Rudman suggested that the House would have to be returned to the descendants of Sir Frank should New Zealand become a republic.

== See also ==
- Government Houses of New Zealand
- Government Houses of the British Empire and Commonwealth
