= 1947 Birthday Honours (New Zealand) =

Awards list for New Zealand

The 1947 King's Birthday Honours in New Zealand, celebrating the official birthday of King George VI, were appointments made by the King on the advice of the New Zealand government to various orders and honours to reward and highlight good works by New Zealanders. They were announced on 12 June 1947.

The recipients of honours are displayed here as they were styled before their new honour.

== Knight Bachelor ==
- The Honourable Harold Featherston Johnston – formerly a judge of the Supreme Court.
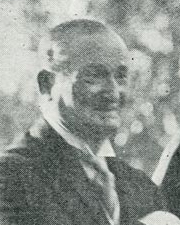
Sir Harold Johnston

== Order of the Bath ==
=== Companion (CB) ===
Military division

- Commodore George Haines Faulkner DSC – Royal Navy (Retired).

== Order of Saint Michael and Saint George ==
=== Companion (CMG) ===
- John Malcolm MD FRSE – professor emeritus, University of Otago. For services to the medical profession.
- William Henry Moyes – formerly headmaster, New Plymouth Boys' High School.
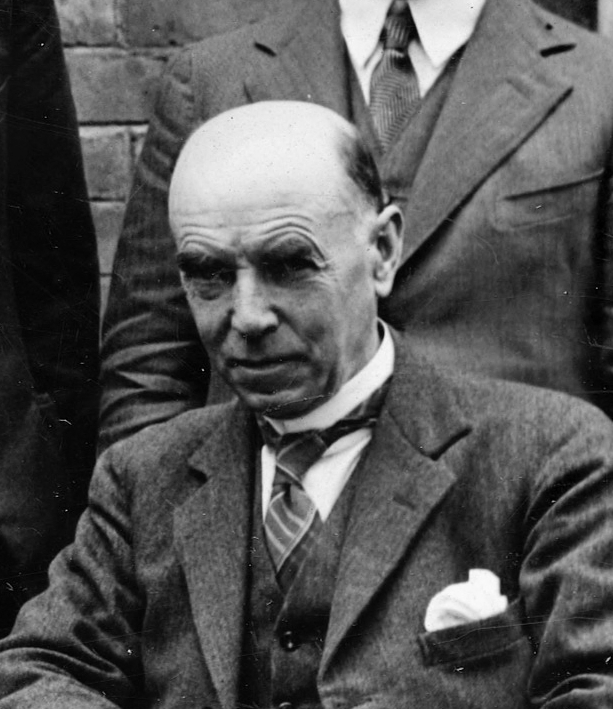
John Malcolm

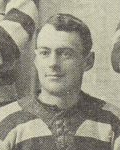
William Moyes

== Order of the British Empire ==
=== Knight Commander (KBE) ===
Civil division

- Thomas Anderson Hunter CBE – of Wellington. For services in connection with dental health and welfare.
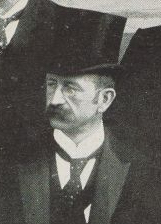
Sir Thomas Hunter

=== Commander (CBE) ===
Civil division

- George Finley Dixon MBE – a private secretary to ministers of the Crown for 31 years.
- Thomas David James Leech – dean of the Faculty of Engineering, Auckland University College.

Military division

- Brigadier Leslie Potter DSO – New Zealand Military Forces.

=== Officer (OBE) ===
Civil division

- Joseph Elmsley Broadfoot – director, Institute for the Blind, Auckland.
- Helen Matilda Comrie – of Auckland. For valuable services to nursing.
- Walter Verran Dyer – chairman, Education Board, Wellington.
- Waata Roore Erueti – of Aramiro, Whatawhata. For services to the Māori people.
- James John Marlow – of St Kilda, Dunedin. For municipal services.
- Colin Miln. For services in connection with the Returned Services' Association in Christchurch.
- Patrick John Monaghan MB BS – chief medical officer, Western Samoa.
- Charles Ormond Morse – of Dargaville. For municipal services.
- Archibald Frank Nicoll – of Christchurch. For services to art.
- Raharuhi Pururu – of Horohoro, Rotorua. For services to the Māori people.
- Frank Taylor Sandford – official secretary, high commissioner's office, London, 1931–39. For public services.

Military division

- Commander (E) Alan John Norris – Royal Navy.
- Lieutenant-Colonel Vincent Gordon Jervis – New Zealand Military Forces.
- Lieutenant-Colonel Walter Sneddon McKinnon – New Zealand Military Forces.
- Acting Wing Commander Cameron Archer Turner – Royal New Zealand Air Force.
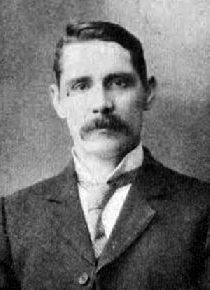
James Marlow

=== Member (MBE) ===
Civil division

- Eric Jack Daniel – secretary, Returned Services' Association, Ashburton.
- Jessie Miller Grant. For patriotic and social welfare work in the Waiapu Zone.
- James Fort Himburg – of Dunedin. For patriotic work, particularly in organising, entertainments for the Forces.
- Charles Ivory Jennings – of Rangiora. For municipal services.
- Titiata Elizabeth Paora Kawharu – district health nurse, Dargaville. For services in North Auckland and Rarotonga.
- Lilly Grace McLean – district nurse, Great Barrier Island.
- William Meikleham – manager, special school, Otekaieke. For services in connection with the care and training of backward and defective children.
- Maude Morris – lately matron, Orakanui Home, Waitati.
- Leslie Gordon Olliff – employed in the naval dockyard at Auckland.
- Edward James Rose. For services to the St John's Ambulance Brigade, West Coast district.
- Thomas Bankes Smith – employed in the Lighthouse Service, Marine Department.
- Catherine Thomson – of Brooklyn, Wellington. For services to the St John's Ambulance Brigade.
- Florence Ellen Woodhouse – staff clerk, Lands and Survey Department.

Military division

- Temporary Acting Lieutenant Edward William Blakiston – Royal New Zealand Navy.
- 800287 Warrant Officer Class II Alfred John Baigent – New Zealand Military Forces.
- Captain William Hoole Cummings – New Zealand Military Forces.
- 19270 Warrant Officer Class I James Edward Hobson – New Zealand Military Forces.
- Major John Alexander Pountney – New Zealand Military Forces.
- Acting Squadron Leader David Charles De Rungs – Royal New Zealand Air Force.
- Acting Squadron Leader Jesse Julius De Willimoff DFC – Royal New Zealand Air Force.
- Acting Squadron Leader Frederick William Thornton – Royal New Zealand Air Force.
- Warrant Officer Clement Sydney Boulton – Royal New Zealand Air Force.

== Companion of the Imperial Service Order (ISO) ==
- Harold Digby-Smith – chairman, Social Security Commission.
- John William Macdonald – commissioner, Government Life Insurance Department.

== British Empire Medal (BEM) ==
Military division

- Leading Writer Victor Noel Duncan – Royal New Zealand Navy.
- Chief Petty Officer Radio Mechanic Richard Garfield Williams – Royal New Zealand Navy.
- Temporary Warrant Officer Class I Alfred George Burbage – New Zealand Military Forces.
- Staff Sergeant Wilfred Reynolds Paine – New Zealand Military Forces.
- Flight Sergeant Frank Stanley George Crosby – Royal New Zealand Air Force.
- Flight Sergeant Bruce Gordon Thiele Johnstone – Royal New Zealand Air Force.
- Flight Sergeant David William Jones – Royal New Zealand Air Force.
- Corporal Roy Sedric Waterhouse – Royal New Zealand Air Force.
- Sergeant Gladys Amelia Cruickshank – New Zealand Women's Auxiliary Air Force.

== Royal Red Cross ==
=== Associate (ARRC) ===
- Senior Charge Sister Venus Marshall Price – New Zealand Army Nursing Service.

== Air Force Cross (AFC) ==
- Flight Lieutenant Edward Pattison Booth Ebbett – Royal New Zealand Air Force.
- Flying Officer Harold Vincent Carlyle – Royal New Zealand Air Force.
- Warrant Officer Ivan Bruce Carrie – Royal New Zealand Air Force.
