= John Malcolm (professor) =

New Zealand physiologist

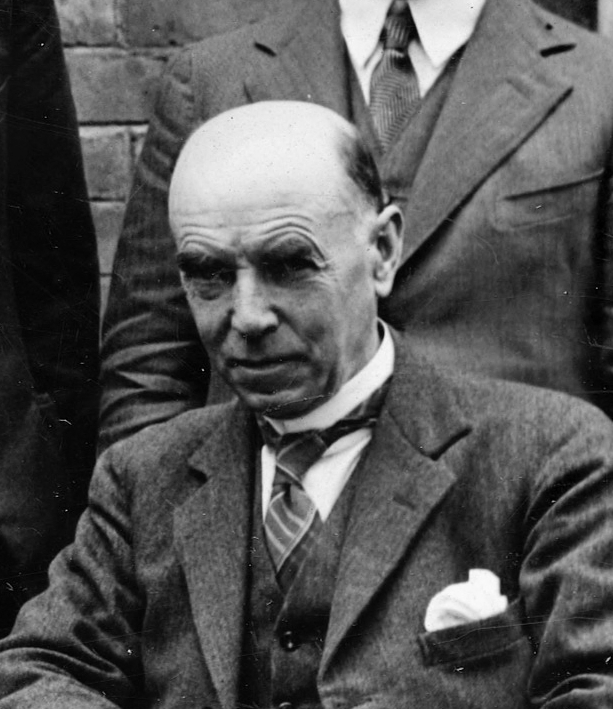
Malcolm in 1936

John Malcolm CMG (31 August 1873 – 17 June 1954) was a New Zealand professor at the University of Otago and physiologist.

== Life ==
He was born in Halkirk, Caithness, Scotland, on 31 August 1873 the son of John Malcolm, a public works contractor.

He studied medicine at the University of Edinburgh graduating with an MBChB in 1897 and gaining his MD in 1899. He initially lectured in chemical physiology at the University of Edinburgh. He lived at 1 Sciennes Road in the south side of the city.

In 1905 he obtained a post of professor of physiology at the University of Otago in New Zealand. In 1933 he was elected a Fellow of the Royal Society of Edinburgh. His proposers were Sir Edward Albert Sharpey-Schafer, William Anderson Bain, Walter Phillips Kennedy, and Philip Eggleton.

In the 1947 King's Birthday Honours, Malcolm was appointed a Companion of the Order of St Michael and St George for services to the medical profession.

== Family ==
On 8 November 1912, he married Vicky Simpson at All Saints' Church in Dunedin. They had one daughter and two sons. One of their sons, John Laurence Malcolm, after working as senior lecturer with John Eccles from 1942 to 1947 at the University of Otago, worked temporarily at St Thomas's Hospital Medical School in London, then emigrated from New Zealand in 1953 to be professor of physiology at the University of Aberdeen and died in 2001.

Vicky Malcolm died in 1953. John Malcolm died in Dunedin on 17 June 1954.
