= Capital of New Zealand =

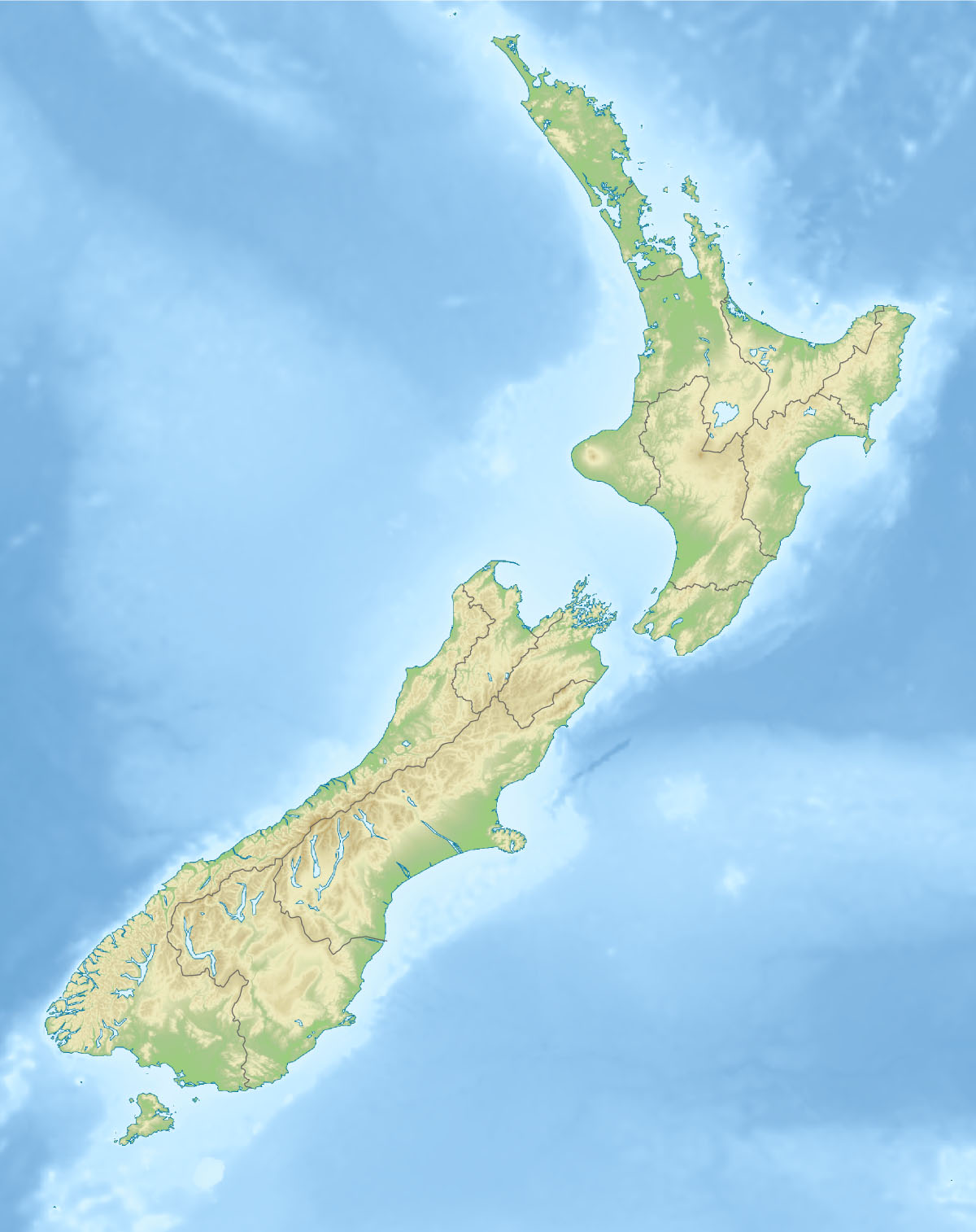
The past and present capitals of New Zealand

The capital of New Zealand has been Wellington since 1865. New Zealand's first capital was Old Russell (Okiato), in 1840–1841. Auckland was the second capital, from 1841 to 1865. Parliament was permanently moved to Wellington after an argument that persisted for a decade. As the members of parliament could not agree on the location of a more central capital, Wellington was decided on by three Australian commissioners.

== Okiato ==
Okiato or Old Russell is a small holiday spot in the Bay of Islands, 7 kilometres (4.3 mi) south of present-day Russell, which was then known as Kororāreka. Okiato was New Zealand's first national capital, for a short time from 1840 to 1841, before the seat of government was moved to Auckland. William Hobson arrived in New Zealand on 29 January 1840, the date now celebrated as the Auckland Anniversary Day. As Lieutenant-Governor he proclaimed British sovereignty in New Zealand the following day. On 30 January 1840 the Union Jack was flown on the masthead of the Herald, the ship that brought Hobson to the Bay of islands. That day the flag was also saluted by guns.

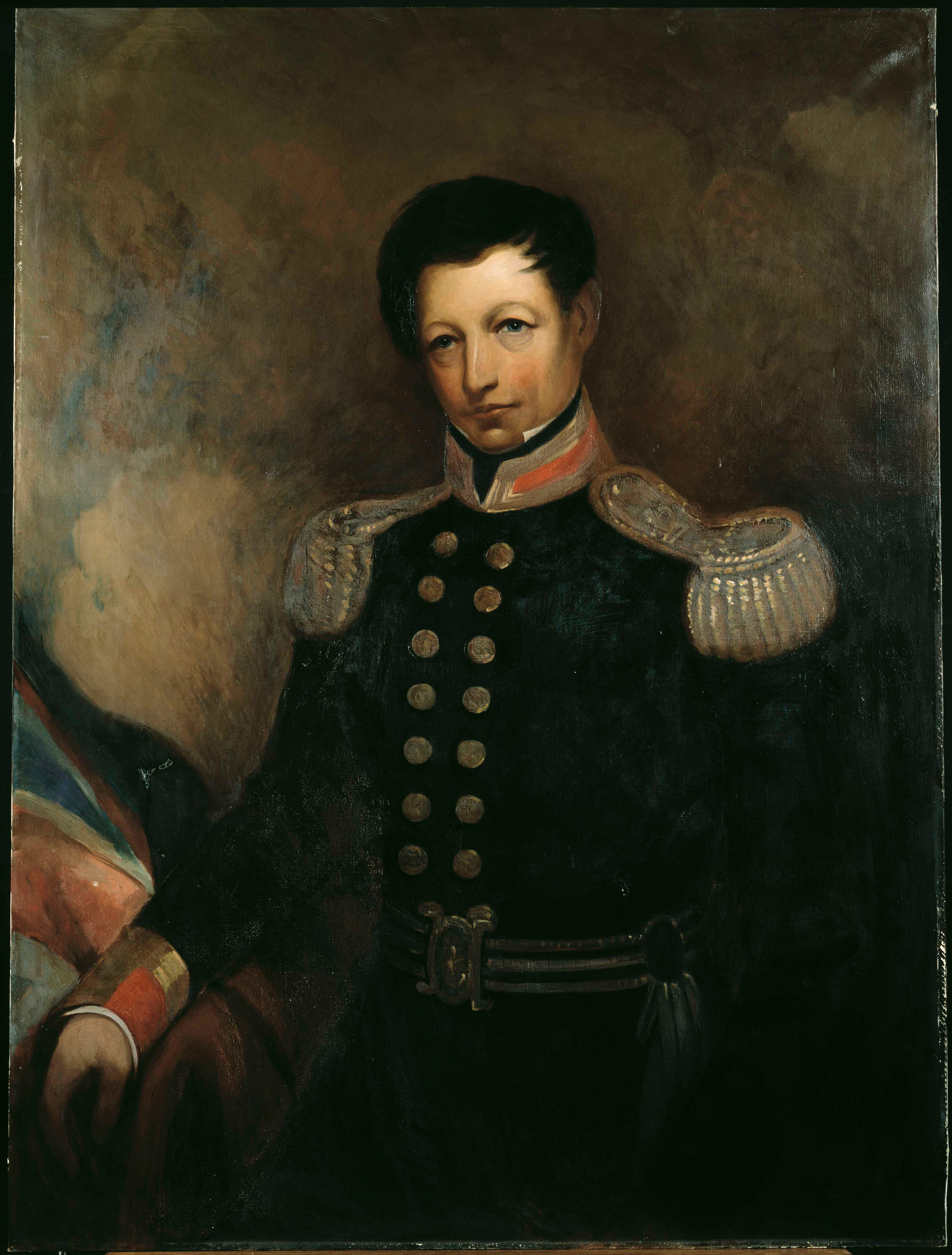
Portrait of Capt. William Hobson by James McDonald, 1913

A capital needed to be decided on and, immediately after the signing of the Treaty of Waitangi on 6 February 1840, Hobson sought advice from those who had been living in New Zealand for some time. The missionary Henry Williams recommended the area around the Waitematā Harbour. William Cornwallis Symonds agreed with that assessment. A week after the signing of the treaty, seven Māori chiefs from Ōrākei on the Waitematā Harbour came to see Hobson and invited him to stay amongst them. They wanted protection from a rival iwi, the Ngāpuhi, and offered him land in return for living there. On 21 February, a small party including Hobson, Williams, Symonds, Captain Joseph Nias, and Felton Mathew left on the Herald to explore the Waitematā; they arrived there two days later. They visited various places, but on 1 March, Hobson suffered a stroke which paralysed half of his body and affected his speech. Rather than delegate the decision making to his officers, the party returned to the Bay of Islands with the task incomplete.

Mathew, who was Surveyor General, was then instructed to report on possible locations for a capital in the Bay of Islands. His initial recommendation was for Kororāreka, but there were conflicting land claims and Hobson refused to accept this recommendation as he felt that he had insufficient authority to overcome those legal problems. His second recommendation was Captain James Reddy Clendon's property, as it met the requirements for a good anchorage and immediate availability of land suitable for subdivision and on-sale to settlers. Locations such as Paihia and Kerikeri were bypassed for various reasons.

Pōmare II, the local Māori chief in the 1830s, sold land at Okiato to British merchant and ship owner Captain Clendon on 7 December 1830 for £28 15s. Clendon settled there in 1832 and set up a trading station with partner Samuel Stephenson. Clendon became the first United States Consul for New Zealand in 1838 or 1839. Clendon wanted £23,000 for the 380 acres (150 ha) of land, the house, two small cottages, a large store and other buildings. Hobson eventually agreed with Clendon on £15,000; the agreement was made on 22 March and Hobson took possession in May. Clendon had only been paid £1,000 when word was received that Governor George Gipps did not sanction the purchase. Clendon received a further £1,250 and a land grant of 10,000 acres (4,000 ha) at Papakura.

Hobson changed its name from Okiato to Russell, in honour of the Secretary of State for the Colonies Lord John Russell. Hobson and his family moved there in May 1840 and officials, troops, workmen and immigrants took up residence in permanent or temporary buildings and tents. Mathew drew up ambitious plans for a town, but only one of the intended roads was ever built – leading directly from the town hall to the town jail. A year later Hobson moved the capital to Auckland and most of the Russell (i.e. Okiato) residents moved there too. A few officials lived on in the Government House at Russell but when it and the offices burned down in May 1842, they moved to Kororāreka leaving Russell virtually deserted.

Kororāreka was part of the Port of Russell and gradually became known as Russell also. In January 1844 Governor Robert FitzRoy officially designated Kororāreka as part of the township of Russell. Now the name Russell applies only to the former Kororāreka while Okiato has resumed its original name. There is often confusion between modern-day Russell, Kororāreka and Okiato in relation to the original capital: even the historian Michael King in The Penguin History of New Zealand—his most notable work and the most commonly-read New Zealand history book—incorrectly names Kororāreka as the country's first capital.

== Auckland ==
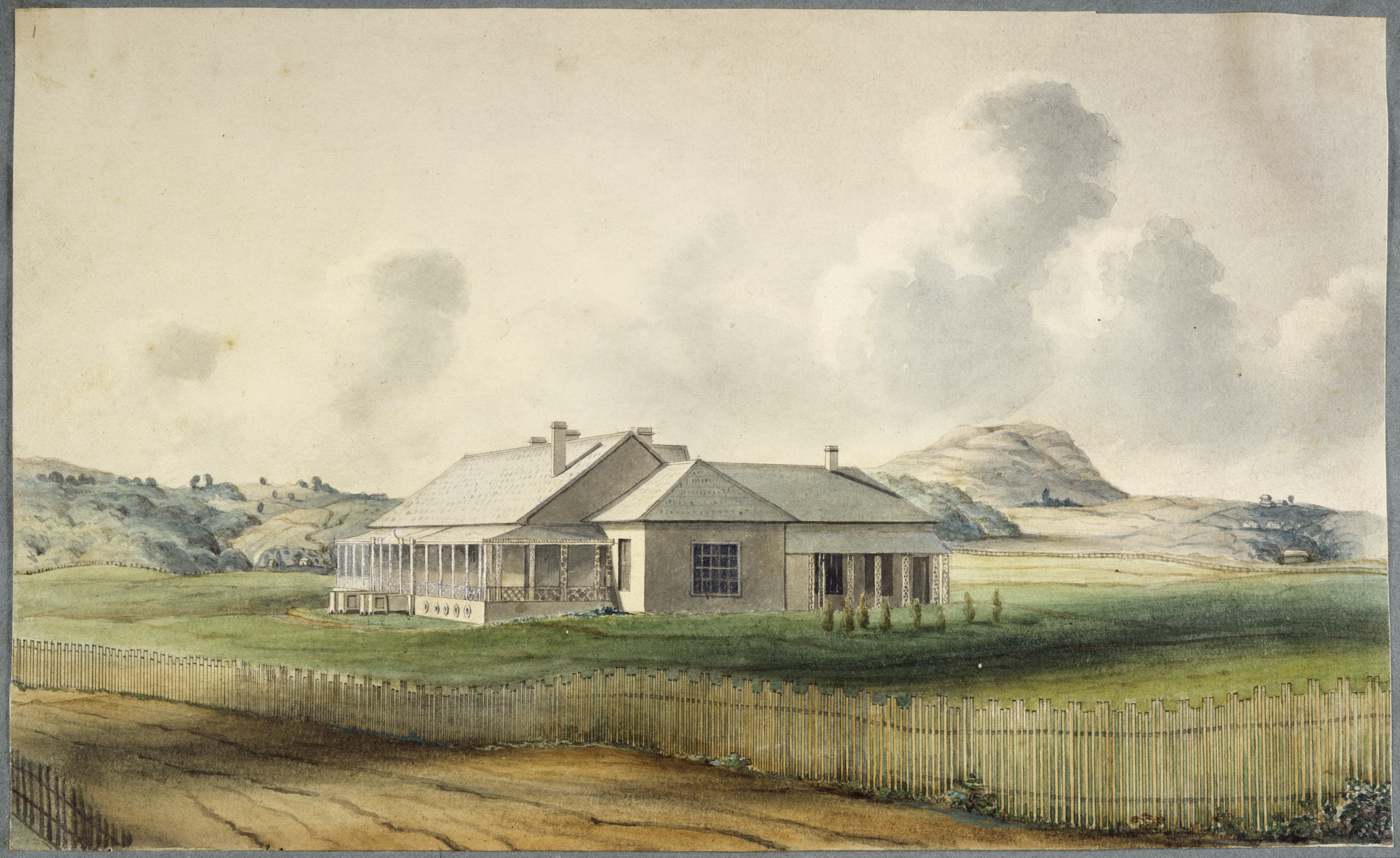
The first Government House in Auckland, as painted by Edward Ashworth in 1842 or 1843

There is no doubt that Hobson regarded Russell as a temporary capital only. On 18 April 1840, he sent Mathew on a second journey south; the Surveyor General was instructed to explore the harbours of Whangārei, Mahurangi, and Waitematā, and to pay particular attention to a location on the southern shore of the Waitematā. Mathew spent two months exploring the various locations and rejected Whangārei and Mahurangi, but also rejected the site favoured by Hobson that later became known as Hobsonville. In his words, it was "totally unfit for the site of the principal settlement, and indeed ill adapted for a settlement at all". Mathew recommended the Panmure Basin for the settlement, which had numerous advantages, but he conceded that access from the harbour was difficult.

Once Hobson had regained some health, he went south to check Mathew's recommendations. On 6 July, he visited Panmure and immediately dismissed it over the difficult access by water. Hobson also admitted that his favoured location was impractical. After the party watched a sunset and were impressed by a "lovely aspect of the shore further down the harbour in the golden glow of the late afternoon", they went ashore there the following day. They agreed that the place held great promise for a future capital; it is believed that they landed at Shelly Beach in Ponsonby. By the end of the month, the decision was made that the capital would shift to the Waitematā.

On 13 September 1840, a barque left Russell for the Waitematā. On board were seven Government officials, some cabin passengers, and numerous steerage passenger. The party, under the command of Symonds, was to finalise the choice of the future capital, buy the land off the Maori, erect stores and accommodation buildings, and find a site for Government House. On 18 September, the land (some 3,000 acres or 1,200 hectares) had been chosen and an agreement signed with Āpihai Te Kawau and others representing the Ngāti Whātua iwi. A flagstaff was erected on Point Britomart, and Her Majesty's health was "most rapturously drunk with cheers long and loud". Sarah Mathews, the wife of the Surveyor General, recorded in her diary that the name "Auckland" was inscribed in the flag pole, together with the date of the land purchase. This may be regarded as the unofficial naming of the city, as the name was first put in writing by Hobson on 10 November of that year. George Eden, 1st Earl of Auckland was First Lord of the Admiralty. In 1834, he had given a commission to William Hobson to sail for the East Indies on the Rattlesnake, which ended a six-year period without a command and on half pay. Whilst the name was bestowed in gratitude, it certainly met with general approval, as Lord Auckland was at the height of his fame in 1840 after he had been appointed Viceroy of India in 1835. Queen Victoria's approval of Auckland as the name for the settlement was published in the New Zealand Gazette on 26 November 1842.

Work progressed well in Auckland. Hobson first visited Auckland on 17 October 1840 to check on progress, and decide on the location for Government House. He returned to the Bay of Islands, having decided to take up residence in Auckland in the following year. Government House was a kit set built in England and shipped out to New Zealand, weighing 250 tonnes (250 long tons; 280 short tons). It had 16 rooms, was 120 feet (37 m) long, 50 feet (15 m) wide, and 24 feet (7.3 m) high. It was placed on the corner of Hobson and Cook Streets. The officials and all of government's papers were moved from the Bay of Islands to Auckland in January 1841. Hobson moved into his new residence on 14 March 1841, and with him moving in, the capital had shifted from the Bay of Islands to Auckland.

The first Supreme Court in New Zealand was built in 1842 on the corner of Queen Street and Victoria Street West. The court was presided over by Justice Martin.

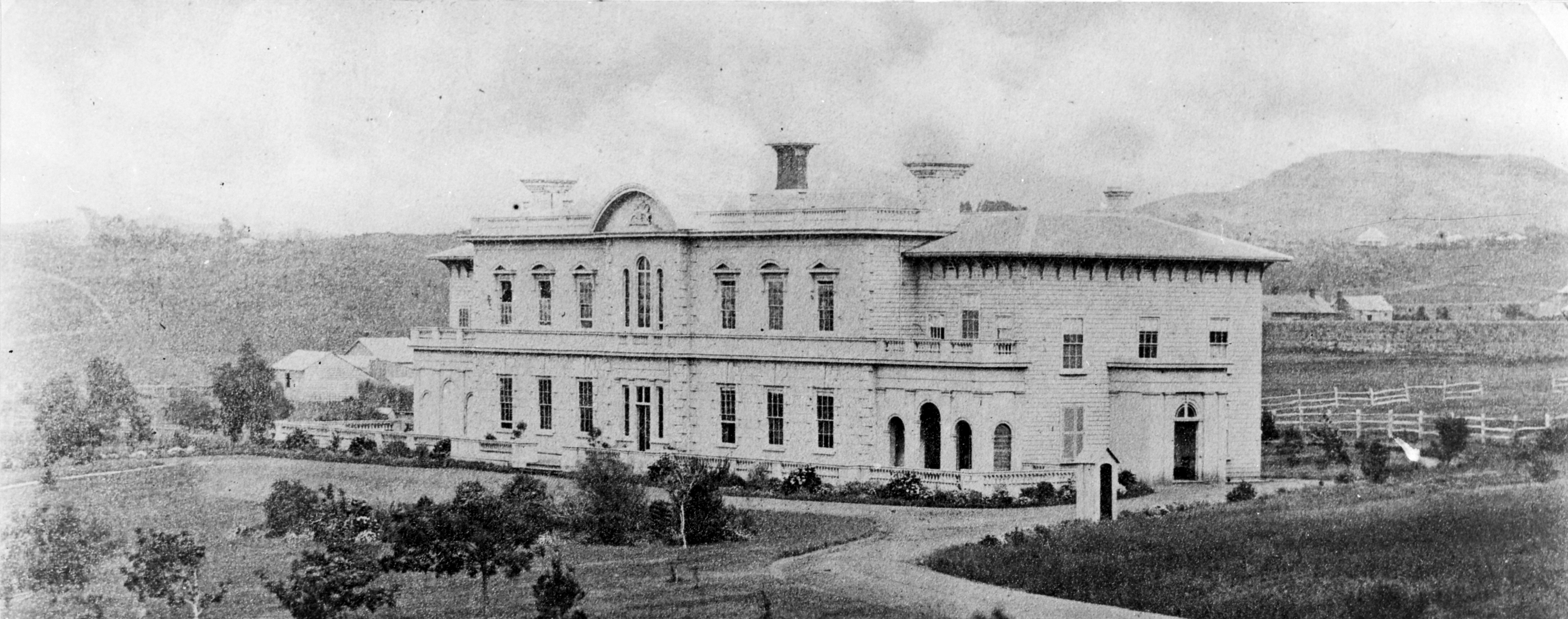
Auckland's third Government House, shown here in the 1860s or 1870s, is today known as Old Government House.

On 23 June 1848, Government House burned down during Sir George Grey's tenure as Governor. Nobody came to harm but the building was a total loss. A viceregal residence was then rented for many years (known as Scoria House and located on Karangahape Road) before the new Government House was built in 1856. Construction of this building was part of Auckland's campaign to retain the seat of government, as the discussion about the capital moving further south had already started. This building formally became part of the University of Auckland in 1969, is now known as Old Government House, and was registered by the New Zealand Historic Places Trust as a Category I heritage structure in 1983.

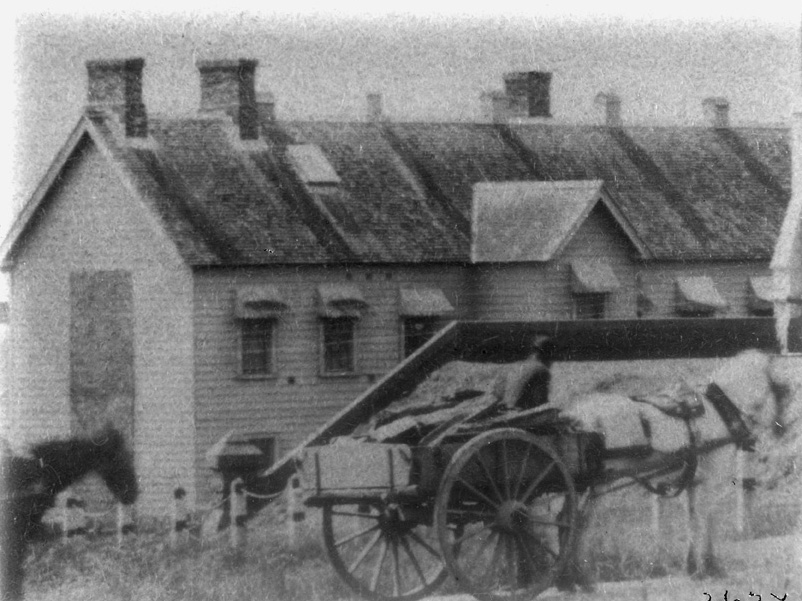
General Assembly House in Auckland in the 1870s, known as the "Shedifice"

The initial form of government was an executive council formed of public servant appointed by and responsible to the governor. This changed when the New Zealand Constitution Act 1852, an Act of the Parliament of the United Kingdom that granted self-government to the Colony of New Zealand, was received. This allowed for a bicameral General Assembly (or Parliament), consisting of the Governor, an appointed Legislative Council and an elected House of Representatives, with an Executive Council nominally appointed by the Governor. It also allowed for provincial governments, and six provinces were initially established. The first general election was held in 1853 and Parliament convened in Auckland for its first session, which was opened on 27 May 1854. On 3 June, the question of the seat of Parliament was first discussed, with Edward Gibbon Wakefield arguing that the seat of government must be shifted to Wellington. Travel to and from parliament was arduous, and the members from the far south had taken two months to get to Auckland. A more central location was desirable, a move not supported by the members from Auckland constituencies. What also did not help was that the General Assembly House had been erected in a hurry and was nothing more than a shell, and members called it the "Shedifice". The wind blew through the building, it leaked in the rain, and basic amenities like toilets were missing. Built on what was then the edge of town, it was a building without comforts.

Arguments over where Parliament should meet were had for a decade. James FitzGerald, who had briefly lead the country's first ministry, moved that the next session "should be held in a more central position in the colony". He had failed to consult with others beforehand, and many of the southern members were absent when the votes were cast, and the proposal was defeated 13 to 11. In 1856, a resolution that the next session should be held in Auckland was amended by substituting the phrase "a more central position" as the location, but the matter was left for the governor to decide. Only a few months later, a proposal for the next session to be convened in Nelson was narrowly defeated. The governor, Thomas Gore Browne, suggested that there could be merit in having alternating meetings in Wellington and Auckland. After much argument, it was decided to hold the second session of the 3rd Parliament in Wellington, and parliament met from July to September 1862 in the building of the Wellington Provincial Council. A proposal to make this move to Wellington permanent was lost by a single vote. The Wellington Provincial Council buildings were built in 1858 and were opulent in style; the stark contrast to the "Shedifice" in Auckland was part of Wellington's campaign to entice members of parliament to move the capital to their city.

After the capital had moved to Wellington, the Parliament Building was eventually transferred to the University of Auckland and demolished in 1919. Government House remained one of the seats for the governor, who alternates between Wellington and Auckland to this day. Old Government House remained in this use until 1969, when Sir Frank and Lady Mappin donated the current Government House (Birchlands) that is located in Mount Eden. Old Government House has since been in use by the University of Auckland.

== Wellington ==
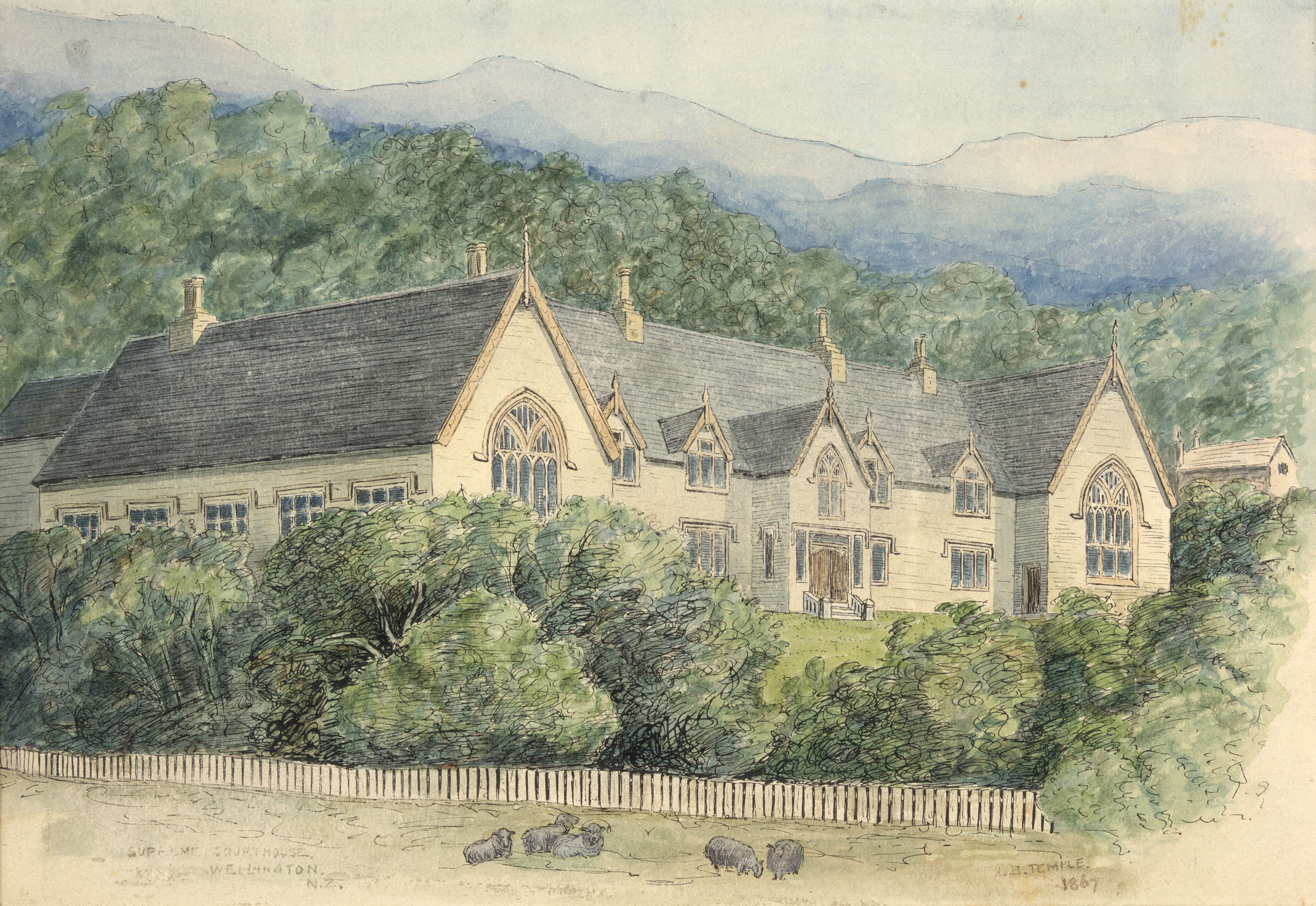
1867 watercolour of the Wellington Provincial Council Building by L. B. Temple

Following a motion in parliament by Alfred Domett, the 4th Premier, three Australian commissioners were tasked with deciding where the capital should move to. The motion asked for the colonial governors of New South Wales, Victoria, and Tasmania to appoint one representative of each of those colonies. The appointees were Joseph Docker, a member of the New South Wales Legislative Council, Francis Murphy, the Speaker of the Victorian Legislative Assembly, and Ronald Campbell Gunn, a former member of the Tasmanian House of Assembly and the Tasmanian Legislative Council. Sir George Grey appointed the commissioners to fulfil the brief "that the Seat of Government should be placed in a central position, that is to say, somewhere upon the shores of Cook's Straits." The commissioners inspected Wellington, Picton, Queen Charlotte Sound, the Tory Channel, Blenheim, Pelorus Sound, Havelock and Nelson. Their criteria were the central position in New Zealand that was asked for, access by water, land availability, resources in the surrounding country, defence considerations, and any natural disadvantages. The commissioners reported their findings in a simple two-page letter, where their main finding was summed up in a single sentence without further elaboration:

Having thus made themselves acquainted, as far as was practicable, with the character and capabilities of both shores of Cook's Strait, the Commissioners have arrived at the unanimous conclusion that Wellington, in Port Nicholson, is the site upon the shores of Cook's Straits which presents the greatest advantages for the administration of the Government of the Colony.

The move of the capital from Auckland to Wellington was undertaken in 1865, and Wellington has been New Zealand's capital since. The fifth session of the 3rd Parliament was opened on 26 July 1865 in Wellington, and this date is regarded as the move of the capital function to Wellington.

=== 150th anniversary ===
The sesquicentennial anniversary of the capital moving to Wellington was celebrated on the weekend of 25 and 26 July 2015. A concert organised by Wellington City Council was held in front of Parliament House and a light show depicting the history of Wellington projected onto the front of the building. The main act was musician Dave Dobbyn, supported by the Orpheus Choir of Wellington. The crowd was addressed by the Speaker of the House, David Carter, and the Mayor of Wellington, Celia Wade-Brown. Several national organisations, including the New Zealand Symphony Orchestra, the Royal New Zealand Ballet, and the New Zealand Opera, offered free performances for the anniversary. Over 30 national institutions opened their collections to the public; this included the Supreme Court, the Reserve Bank, the Katherine Mansfield Birthplace, and the Premier House.

== See also ==
- History of New Zealand
