= Vogel House =

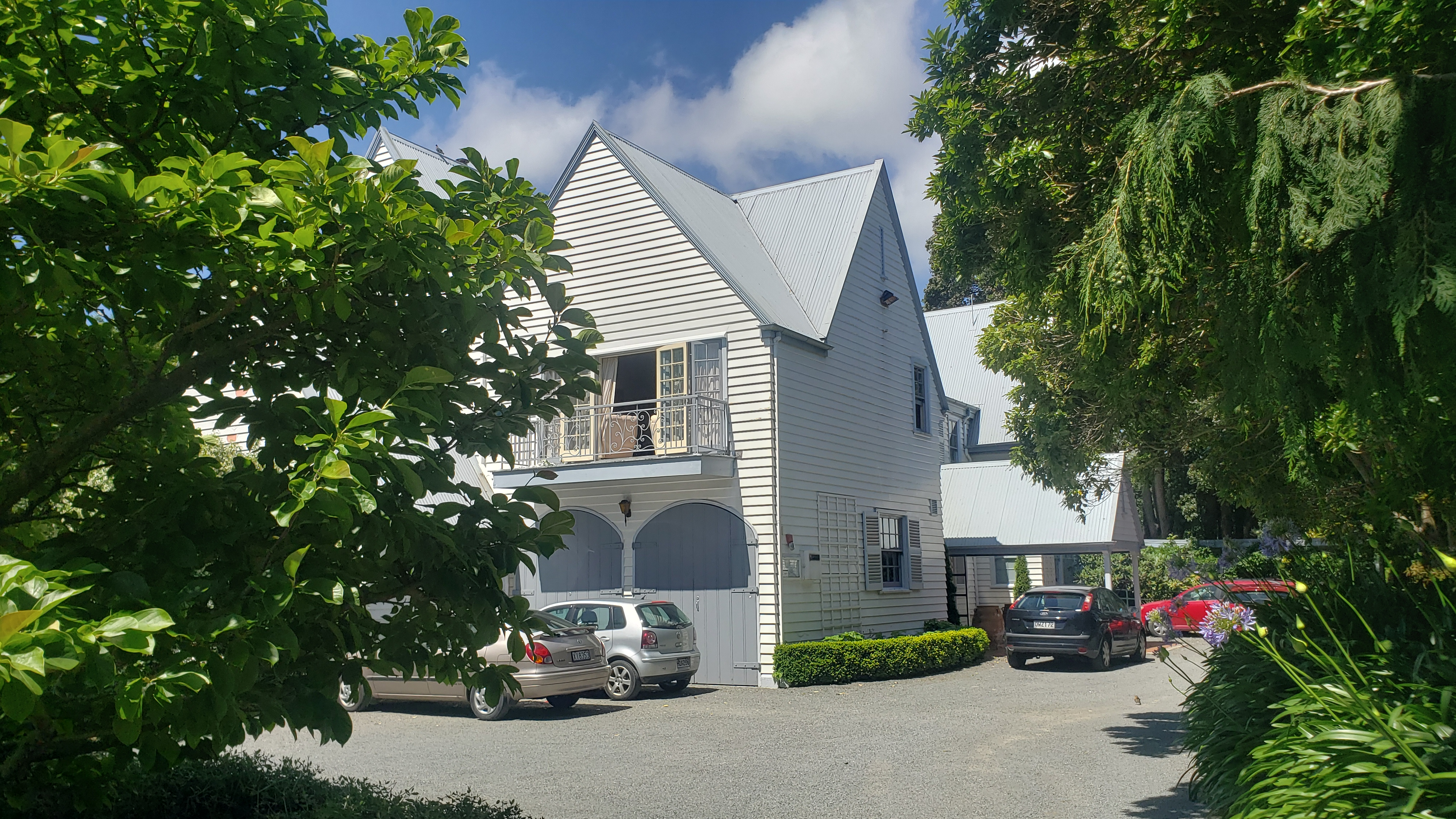
- Vogel House in 2021

General information
- Type: Residential home
- Architectural style: Colonial neo-Georgian style
- Location: 75 Woburn Road, Lower Hutt, New Zealand
- Coordinates: 41.213461°S 174.901694°E
- Completed: 1933
- Renovated: 1980
- Owner: Vogel family

Design and construction
- Architect: Heathcote Helmore
- Main contractor: Walter Dyer

Heritage New Zealand – Category 1
- Designated: 27 June 2008
- Reference no.: 7757

Vogel House at 75 Woburn Road, Lower Hutt, New Zealand, is a neo-Georgian-style home built in 1933. For 13 years, it was the official residence of the Prime Minister of New Zealand, and it housed multiple other ministers and dignitaries.

The home was built in 1933 for James and Jocelyn Vogel. The Vogels gifted the property to the Government in 1965. Initially used by the Australian High Commissioner, it became the official residence of the Prime Minister in 1977. Robert Muldoon lived there from 1977 to 1984. Muldoon's successor David Lange only lived there briefly and chose instead to live in a flat close to Parliament, and in 1990 Premier House became the official prime minister residence. It was then occupied by Ministers Doug Graham and Jim Anderton and Governor-General Anand Satyanand.

The government sought to divest ownership of the property in 2013. The house was ultimately sold back to members of the Vogel family in 2019, after a legal dispute over who the government could sell or give the property to.

Vogel House was listed by the New Zealand Historic Places Trust (since renamed to Heritage New Zealand) as a Category I historic place in 2008.

== Early buildings on the site, and purchase by the Vogels ==
The land that belongs to Vogel House (today 9,637 m^{2} of land) was initially owned by a series of prominent settlers with connection to the New Zealand Company, and had been used as a poultry farm. One of them, James Kelham, had a cottage built in the 1870s or 1880s, and the building is these days the gatehouse. The cottage is possibly the oldest dwelling in Lower Hutt; more than 100 years old in 1987.

The land changed hands numerous times until it was purchased by James and Jocelyn Vogel in 1932, who had married that year. James Vogel was the grandson of Premier Sir Julius Vogel (1835–1899) and the great grandson of Premier James FitzGerald. Jocelyn Vogel (née Riddiford) was the great grand niece of Governor Sir George Grey.

The home was built for them in 1933. It was designed by Heathcote Helmore of the Christchurch architectural firm of Helmore and Cotterill, and built by Walter Dyer of the Lower Hutt firm of Dyer and Halse. It is built in an English, neo-Georgian architectural style.

== Gift to the Government ==
As early as 1963 the Vogels were making overtures to the Government to present the house to the nation as an Official Residence for the Prime Minister. In September 1965, the Vogels gifted the property to the Crown by a Deed of Gift, in which they declared they were “moved by their duty and loyalty to Her Majesty and by a desire to benefit her present and future subjects in New Zealand", and said they wished the land “be kept intact as an entity for such purposes as the Government of New Zealand may from time to time see fit." The timing of the gift was to mark 100 years of Parliament in Wellington. A condition of the gift was that the Vogels could remain in the property until their deaths, though they moved out of the house in 1966 to a residence in the Marlborough Sounds.

== Government use ==
As the Government did not expect that the property would come into their possession for a number of years, little thought had been given to the future use of the building. At one point there was an idea that the house and grounds could be turned into a New Zealand Administration College, the extensive grounds providing ample room to construct the necessary buildings.

Between 1966 and 1976, Vogel House was used as the Australian High Commissioner's residence. The Vogels themselves had suggested this use. The Australian High Commission were known to be keen on the Vogel property as it adjoined the temporary American Embassy and the residence of the United Kingdom trade commissioner adjoined the Vogel House property.

The Australian High Commissioner left the building in 1976, which allowed the Government to provide the property to the newly elected prime minister Robert Muldoon as an official residence. Muldoon accepted happily, on the condition that the property underwent a complete renovation. Muldoon and his wife Thea lived at Vogel House from 1977 to 1984, and entertained guests there including members of the Royal family. Queen Elizabeth II had dinner with him there in February 1977.

Muldoon's successor as prime minister, David Lange, did not like the house. His family stayed in Auckland. He initially lived in Vogel House, but then moved to a flat near Parliament. Vogel House was instead used as a venue for charity functions and entertaining visiting dignitaries.

Lange ended his time as prime minister in 1989. In the late 1980s, Minister of Internal Affairs Michael Bassett had 260 Tinakori Road restored to be the official prime ministerial residence, and it took on that role in 1990. Vogel House was used as a residence for government ministers Doug Graham from 1990 to 1999 and Jim Anderton from 1999 to 2009. Anderton said of the place, "People think, 'Gee, this is Vogel House,' but you realise a lot of state houses are renovated better than this." Mr Anderton said the state should take better care of it, or not own it at all. It received renovations in 2002.

Anderton left Vogel House when it was needed for Governor-General Anand Satyanand. The Governor-General typically resides in Government House, which was undergoing multi-year renovations. Those renovations ended in 2012.

Vogel House was then used by Stephen Joyce, MP as a Wellington based residence prior to it being sold.

== Return to private ownership, and legal battle ==
In 2013, the Government decided it no longer needed the property, and initiated a disposal process under the Land Act 1948. By 2016 the Government had decided to give the asset to the beneficiaries of Jocelyn Vogel's will, which were the Wellington SPCA and the Vogel Charitable Trust. Tim Vogel and Geoff Vogel, the grandchildren of James and Jocelyn Vogel, challenged this decision, saying that their grandparents always meant to leave it to them, and asked the government to give them the property.

Tim and Geoff Vogel requested a review by an independent lawyer, but that lawyer advised the government that neither the Vogels nor the two charities should be given the property. Instead, Land Information New Zealand decided that Vogel House should be sold on the open market and that the money raised be kept by the government, specifically the Crown consolidated fund.

Ultimately, Tim and Geoff Vogel took the matter to the High Court. The Vogels argued that the Land Act allows the property to be allotted to someone without competition from the public if the applicant would suffer "hardship" by the call for public applications, and argued that this could include emotional hardship given the family connection to the property. This was different to LINZ's interpretation of the act, which was that "hardship" could only be claimed if it led to direct financial or property loss.

The High Court decided in favour of the grandsons, determining that the Crown decision contained a material error of law around "hardship", and ordered the Crown to reconsider its decision. Following the court decision, in October 2019 the government sold the house and land to the Vogel family. As of 2020, Tim Vogel said that Vogel family members lived permanently at the house.

== Heritage recognition ==
On 27 June 2008, the New Zealand Historic Places Trust listed Vogel House as a Category I historic place, its most important category, for "its outstanding historical significance".

In 2020 the Vogels asked Hutt Council for a reduction on their rates to cover renovations of the heritage-listed property. The Council agreed and rates were reduced by $6,250 for one year.

The property was valued at $2.4 million as of 2000, and at $5 million as of 2020.
