= Premier House =

Official residence of the Prime Minister of New Zealand

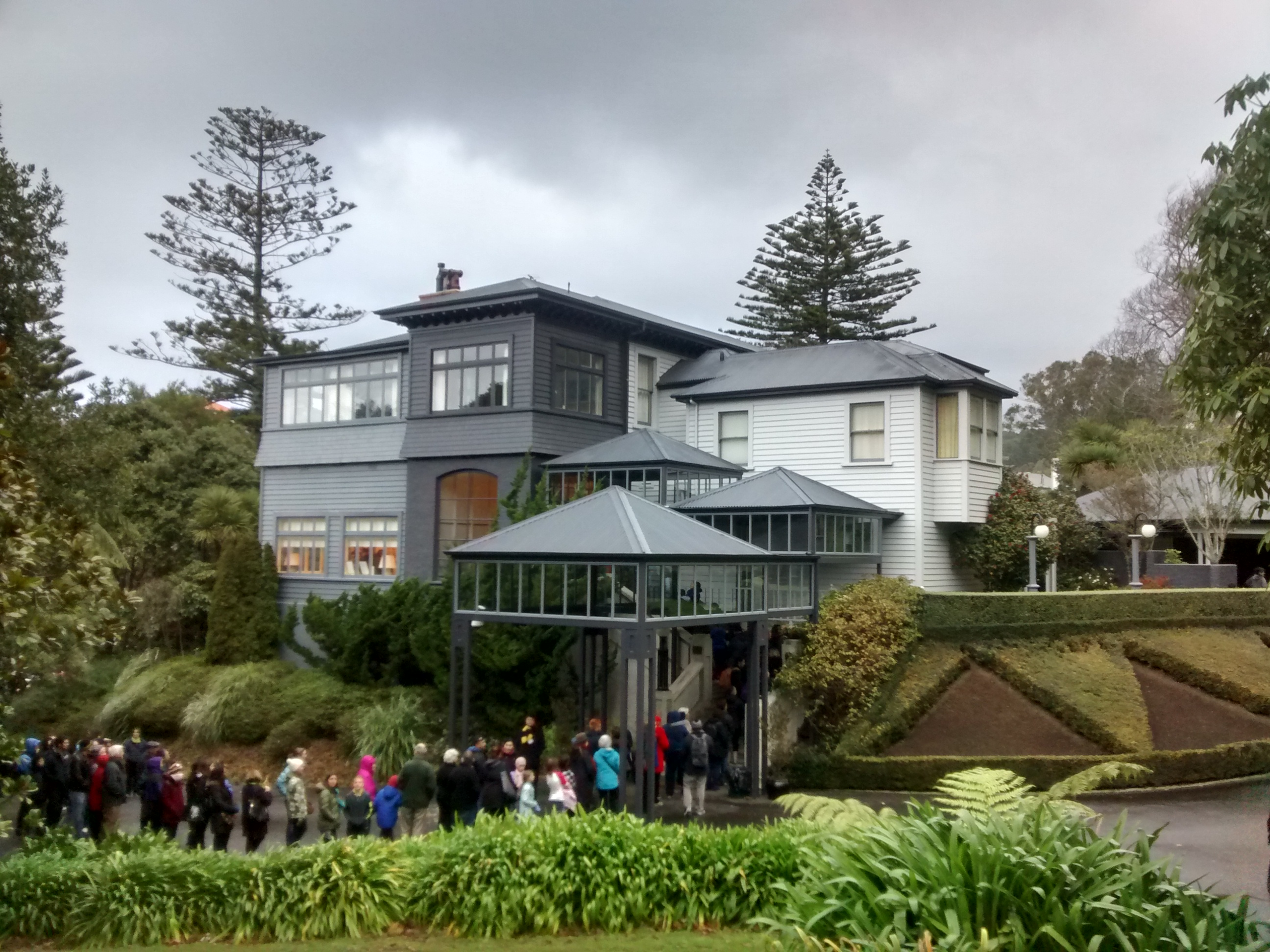
- Premier House during an open day in 2015

General information
- Location: 41°16′36.4″S 174°46′14.8″E, 260 Tinakori Road, Thorndon, Wellington, New Zealand
- Current tenants: Christopher Luxon, Prime Minister of New Zealand
- Owner: The Crown

Heritage New Zealand – Category 1
- Designated: 24 March 1988
- Reference no.: 1371

Premier House (Māori: Te Whare Pirimia) is the official residence of the prime minister of New Zealand, located at 260 Tinakori Road, Thorndon, Wellington, New Zealand.

A private house purchased for the prime minister's official residence when government shifted its base to Wellington in 1865, it was first greatly expanded and then, as its wooden structure deteriorated, shunned in the 1930s by the more modest political leaders on learning the cost of repairs.

It was leased to private individuals for six years in the late 1890s, then returned to use as an official residence for the prime minister until the Great Depression, when a new government in 1935 wished to avoid "show". For more than half a century, the building was used as a dental clinic for children until it was renovated and recommissioned as Premier House in 1990.

== History ==
The original house was built in the early days of the New Zealand colony in 1843 for Wellington's first Mayor, George Hunter. This house, or at least a portion of it, is still located at the southern end of the current building. It has been greatly expanded over the years.

Later the residence of Nathaniel Levin, the house was bought from Richard Collins in early March 1865 to become the official residence of the nation's Premier. (Note: "The Government have been fortunate in securing, at a moderate figure, the beautiful house and grounds, formerly the property of N. Levin, Esq, situated in the Tenekorie Road. It has now become the official residence of the Hon. F. A. Weld. The price paid was £2,950, which, considering the quantity of the land (2½ acres), the locality, etc., must be considered cheap" The Wellington Evening Post page 2, 13 March 1865) Wellington's The Evening Post thought the £2,900 price "must be considered cheap". Auckland's Daily Southern Cross described it as "one of the handsomest villas in the country", but Auckland's local morning paper, The New Zealand Herald, noted the acquisition with the comment "a piece of illegal extravagance". A few weeks later the Daily Southern Cross described the original plan to build a new house as a "monstrous waste of public money".

=== Expansion ===
The house changed little until Julius Vogel and his wife, Mary, arrived in 1873. Within a year they had turned it into an eight-bedroom mansion complete with conservatory and ballroom. The grounds featured what is thought to have been the country's first tennis court. The Vogels were noted for their lavish entertaining, resulting in the house acquiring the nickname of "The Casino".

In the 1920s it was known as 'Ariki Toa', or 'brave chief'.

=== Dental clinic ===
In 1935 Prime Minister Michael Joseph Savage, faced with rebuilding the country's economy in the midst of the Great Depression, lived in Seddon's former residence at 47 Molesworth Street, later purchasing a house high in Northland. Premier House was turned into a school for dental nurses and a children's dental clinic, known to all as "the murder house". It had 40 chairs, later 50. Before fluoridation the molars of the nation's children were soon cored with amalgam. At the time, Mr Langstone, the Minister of Lands, was living there and a new house was built for him in the grounds on the site of the stable. During the war the garden grew vegetables for the local Armed Forces Service Clubs.

=== Restoration ===
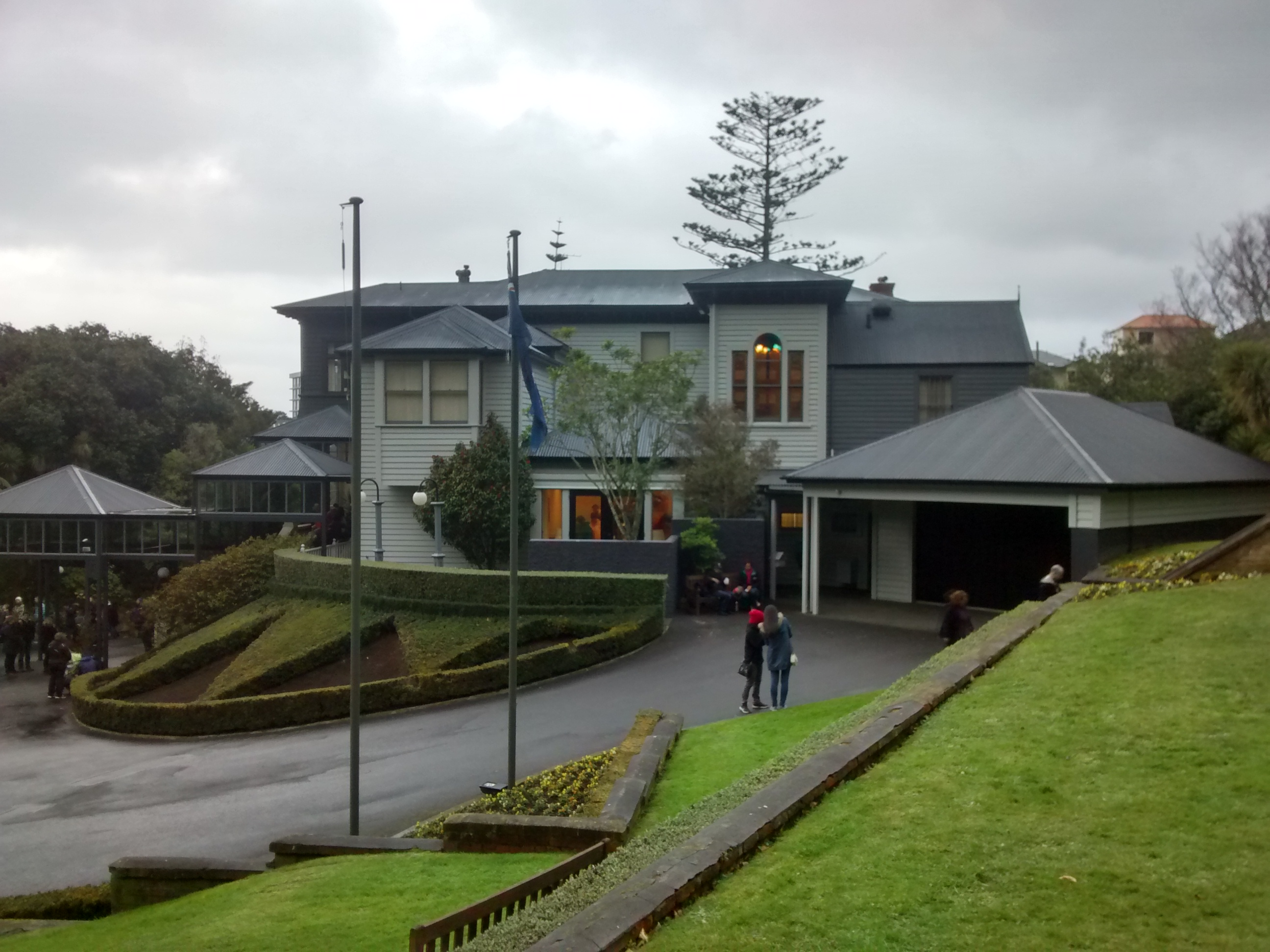
Premier House in 2015, the colour scheme giving some shape to the agglomeration of disparate structures

After many years of institutional use, by the 1980s the building had fallen into disrepair. It was rescued from this decline by Michael Bassett, Minister of Internal Affairs, who initiated moves for the restoration of the building to its early grandeur.

The building received a Category 1 Historic Place ranking from 1988 by Heritage New Zealand and was listed as a heritage place in the Wellington City District Plan.

The restoration was undertaken by Auckland's Grant Group Architects and L. T. McGuinness Construction between December 1989 and 1991. The internal walls were retained and all rooms and most passages were left in their original position. Fire sprinklers, central heating and air conditioning systems were installed along with a new hydraulic lift. The interior decoration carefully reproduces many 19th-century period features, while the overall design is modern. The decor includes a considerable collection of New Zealand art, both old and new.

The conservation of Premier House, as it was renamed, was a 1990 Sesquicentennial (150 years) project. That year Geoffrey Palmer and his wife, Margaret, became its first official residents. In 2018 the house was upgraded, with repairs and maintenance undertaken, at a cost of NZ$3 million.

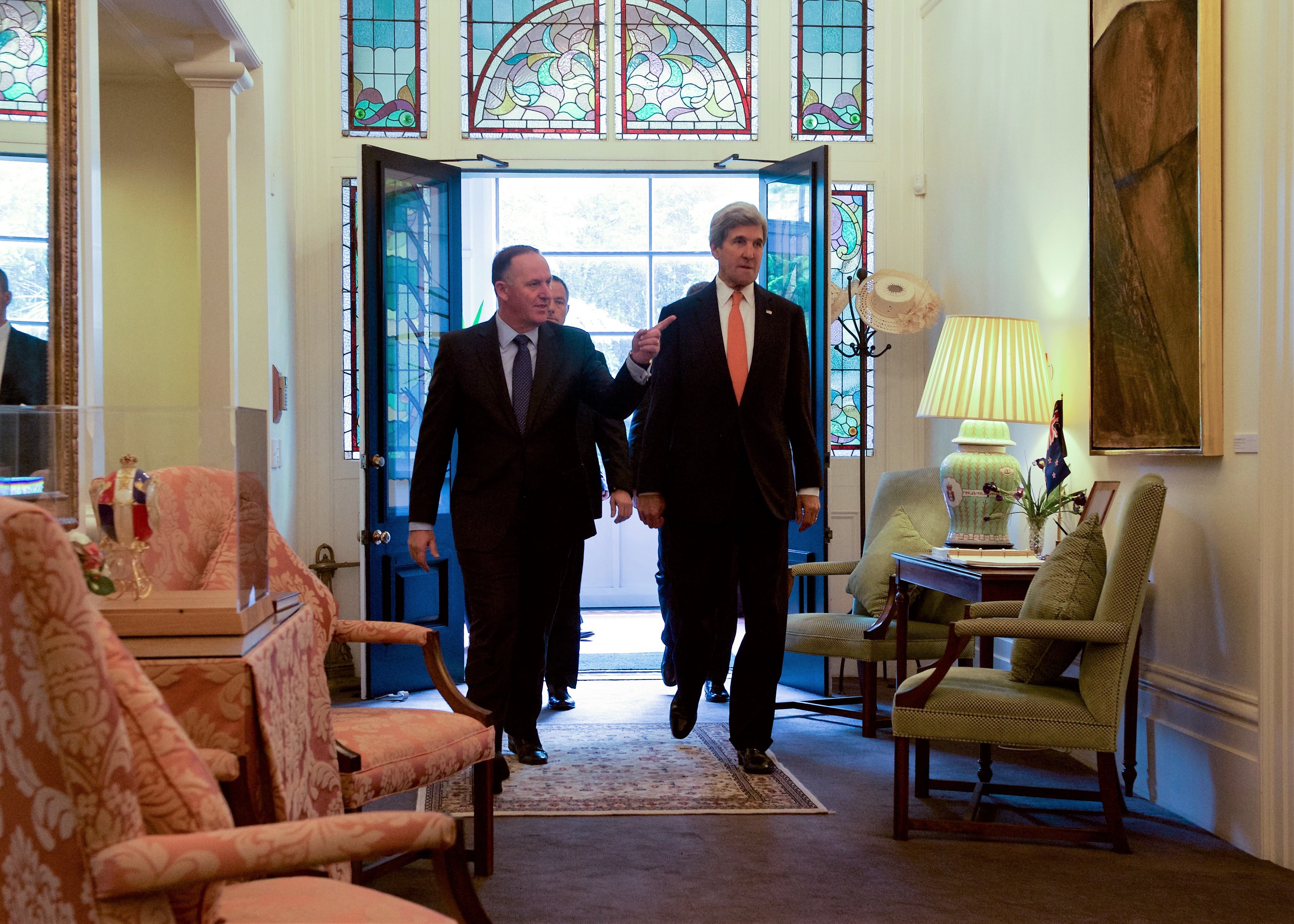
John Key hosts John Kerry in Premier House, November 2016

Since 1990, the house has been the official residence of Prime Ministers Geoffrey Palmer, Mike Moore, Jim Bolger, Jenny Shipley, Helen Clark, John Key and Jacinda Ardern.

Prime Minister Bill English did not live at Premier House during his term (2016–2017) because New Zealand law prohibits Wellington-based MPs from claiming taxpayer-funded accommodation in the capital. His successor, Ardern, based in Auckland, moved into the official residence. Prime Minister Chris Hipkins did not live at Premier House during his term in 2023. As a Wellington-based MP, he had the same legal restrictions as English. Hipkins used Premier House for official functions.

Current Prime Minister Christopher Luxon initially lived in his own Wellington apartment rather than Premier House, citing maintenance issues. In March 2024, Luxon was criticized for claiming a $52,000 living allowance while living in his own mortgage-free Wellington apartment, rather than live at Premier House. He was the first Prime Minister in thirty four years to claim the allowance. He moved into Premier House at the end of September 2024 after superficial renovations.

In early March 2024, Heritage New Zealand acknowledged that Premier House was in a dishevelled state as a result of the multiple purposes it serves. The site is managed by the Department of Internal Affairs while the Premier House Board provides advice on the long-term stewardship of the building. Heritage NZ confirmed that it was working with other agencies to find solutions for long overdue upgrades to Premier House. Tommy's Real Estate sales director Tim Clark has proposed demolishing the site and redeveloping it, claiming it was cheaper than renovating it.

In late March 2024, the Department of Internal Affairs released a 2023 report by the Premier House Board on the condition and future of Premier House. The report proposed four options for maintenance and refurbishment. The first option proposed a NZ$27 million long-term maintenance plan to prevent deterioration over a period of 20 years. The second option proposed a phased refurbishment to address immediate risks at an estimated preliminary cost of NZ$43 million. The third option focusing on addressing building standards and heritage incrementally would cost up to NZ$80 million. The fourth option proposed a full refurbishment of the building over a period of two to three years at a cost of NZ$33 million. The board favoured full refurbishment over long-term maintenance and also recommended negotiating a heritage covenant with Heritage New Zealand to ensure the site's continued protection.

== Official residents ==
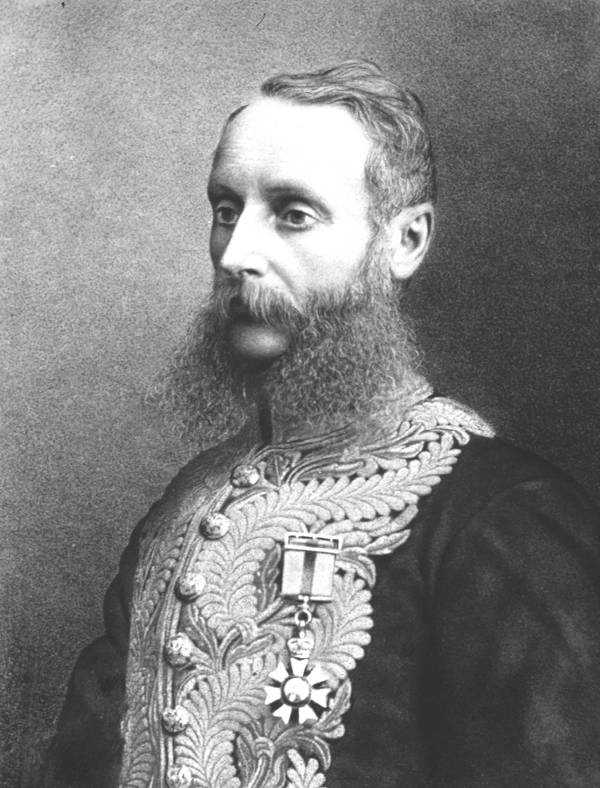
The government of Frederick Weld completed the purchase of the residence.

- 1864–1865 : Hon Sir Frederick Weld, 6th Premier
- 1865–1869 : Hon Sir Edward Stafford, 3rd Premier
- 1869–1873 : Hon Sir William Fox, 2nd Premier
- 1873–1875 : Hon Sir Julius Vogel, 8th Premier. Under Vogel's first premiership the house was greatly expanded.

(1875–1876 : Hon Dr Daniel Pollen, 9th Premier for 7 months)

- 1876–1876 : Hon Sir Julius Vogel, 8th Premier.

(1877–1879 : Hon Sir George Grey, 11th Premier)

- 1879–1882 : Hon Sir John Hall, 12th Premier
- 1882–1883 : Hon Sir Frederick Whitaker, 5th Premier
- 1883–1884 : Hon Sir Harry Atkinson, 10th Premier
- 1884–1887 : Hon Sir Julius Vogel as a cabinet minister in the government of Hon Sir Robert Stout, 13th Premier. More extensions were made to the house due to Vogel's poor health. His recurring gout resulted in an extra office being added for Cabinet meetings and in 1886 the construction of New Zealand's first lift.

The country entered a Depression in the late 1880s and after the Vogels moved out, the new government tried to sell the property. MPs’ salaries had been cut, and the Liberal ministers of the 1890s had to live cheaply. But the press and public fought back. Wellington people valued its spacious grounds as a public amenity. Only the furniture was sold. Some suggested turning the site into an old men’s home or a university, but it stayed empty.

- 1887–1891 : Hon Sir Harry Atkinson, 10th Premier
- 1891–1893 : Rt Hon John Ballance, 14th Premier

(1893–1906 : Rt Hon Richard John Seddon, 15th Premier. Following Ballance's death Seddon remained in his modest ministerial residence at 47 Molesworth Street and the Tinakori Street residence was leased out from 1895 to 1900 when it became a ministerial residence again.)
Tenants
1893–1895 apparently vacant
1895–1899 : Sir Walter Buller, lawyer and ornithologist.
1899–1899 : Percy Smith, surveyor general and secretary for lands and mines and ethnologist.
Official residents

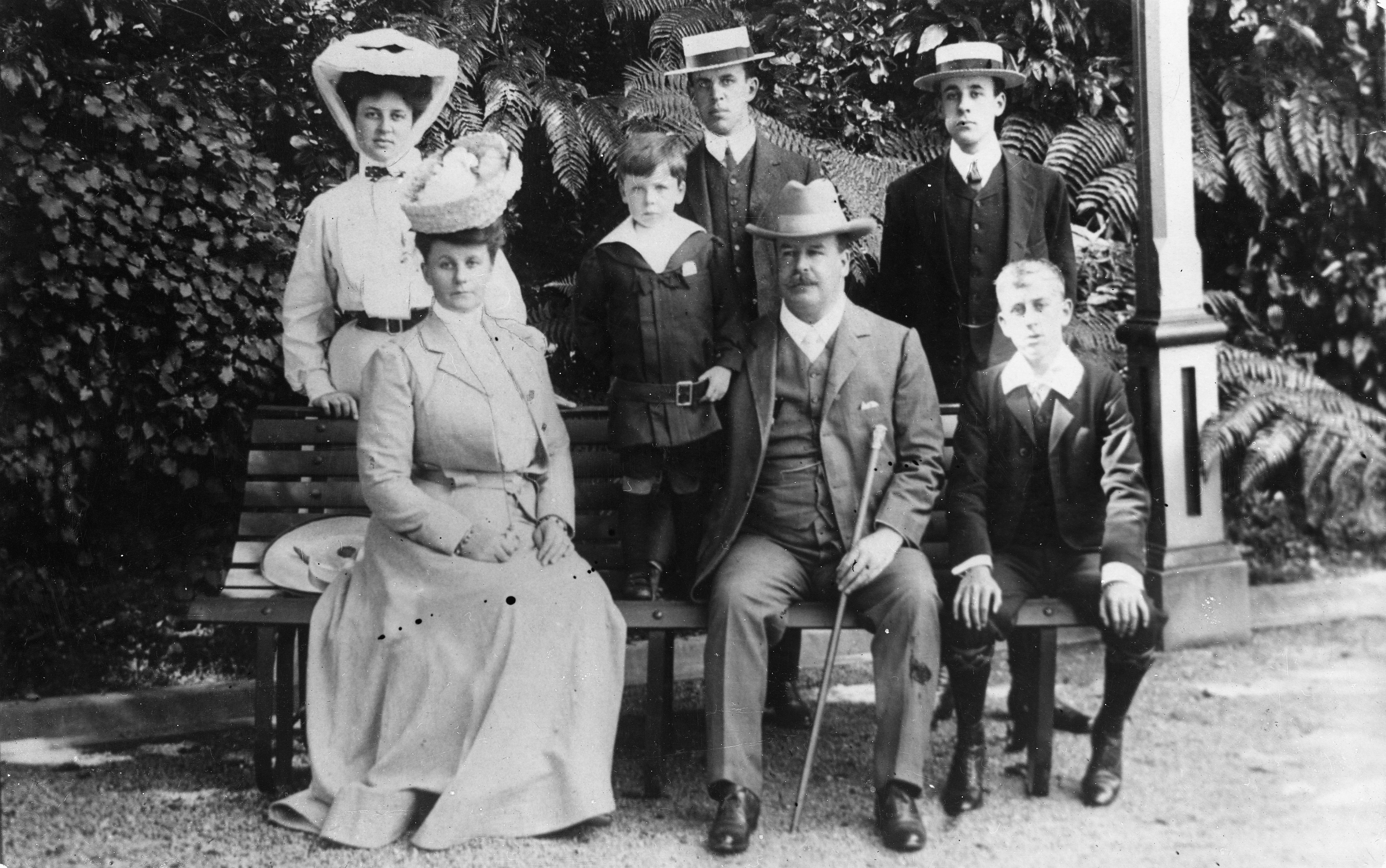
Joseph, later Sir Joseph Ward Baronet, and his family at Awarua 1906

- 1900–1912 : Rt Hon Sir Joseph Ward Bt, as a cabinet minister then Prime Minister from 1906. Now called Awarua, the name of Ward's electorate, the house again became one of the capital's main social places, hosting many formal and informal parties, especially after Ward became Prime Minister following Seddon's death in 1906. One party of particular note was the farewell party given by Miss Eileen Ward, daughter of Sir Joseph Ward, to farewell near neighbour Katherine Mansfield a few days before she left New Zealand for the last time in 1908.
- 1912–1925 : Rt Hon William F Massey, Prime Minister renamed it Ariki Toa, 'brave chief'. During the First World War the Masseys used it for patriotic activities.
- 1925–1928 : Rt Hon Gordon Coates, Prime Minister. The last Prime Minister to live there. Further extensions were made to the building in 1926 when Gordon Coates lived there including rebuilding the conservatory and adding an enclosed veranda above it but major maintenance work seems to have been deferred again.
- 1928–1935 : Rt Hon George Forbes, Prime Minister lived in a flat at Parliament House. Parts of Premier House's floor had subsided up to 30 cm. The ground floor was occupied by the Unemployed and Transport Departments and the upper floor as a ministerial residence by the families of Mr Masters, a former leader of the Legislative Council and Minister of Public Works, Mr Ransom. Following a number of parliamentary debates it was decided by popular demand to not subdivide the land or build Ministerial flats on the grounds. The garden continued to be the location of subscription garden parties raising funds for major charities like YWCA and Girl Guides.

=== Post-restoration ===
- 1989–1990: Rt Hon Geoffrey Palmer
- 1990–1990: Rt Hon Mike Moore
- 1990–1997: Rt Hon Jim Bolger
- 1997–1999: Rt Hon Jenny Shipley
- 1999–2008: Rt Hon Helen Clark
- 2008–2016: Rt Hon John Key
- 2017–2023: Rt Hon Jacinda Ardern
- 2024–present: Rt Hon Christopher Luxon

== Value ==
The property has a land area of 1.5 hectares (3.7 acres) and a rateable value (in 2020) of NZ$23,300,000.

== Other official residences ==
=== 64–66 Harbour View Road ===
From 1939 Michael Joseph Savage (until 1939 at 47 Molesworth Street) lived in a house "Hill Haven" at 64–66 Harbour View Road, Northland, Wellington, which was subsequently used by his successor Peter Fraser until 1949. It was purchased for Michael Joseph Savage "because it is now not necessary (to be within easy walking distance of Parliament) and a Prime Minister is no longer bound to the lowly areas of the Thorndon flats".

=== 41 Pipitea Street ===
From 1950 Sidney Holland lived at No 41 Pipitea Street, Thorndon. The house was subsequently used by Walter Nash, Keith Holyoake and Geoffrey Palmer, and as a ministerial residence by Jim Sutton and Nick Smith. The house was also used for the Pacific Island Affairs Ministry.

=== Vogel House ===
From 1976 to 1990 Vogel House in Lower Hutt was the official residence of the prime minister. It was used by Robert Muldoon.
