= Thomas Hunter (dentist) =

New Zealand dentist and public health administrator

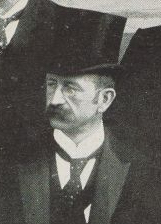
Hunter in 1905

Sir Thomas Anderson Hunter KBE (10 February 1863 – 29 December 1958) was a New Zealand dentist and public health administrator. He was born in Dunedin, New Zealand on 10 February 1863.

Hunter was chairman of Massey Agricultural College from 1936 to 1938, when he resigned. He was appointed a Commander of the Order of the British Empire in 1918, in recognition of his role as director of dental services for the New Zealand military forces during World War I. In the 1947 King's Birthday Honours he was promoted to Knight Commander of the same order, for services in connection with dental health and welfare. In 1935, he was awarded the King George V Silver Jubilee Medal.
