= Mappin (surname) =

Mappin is a surname. Notable people with the surname include:

- Frank Mappin (1884–1975), New Zealand orchardist, horticulturist and philanthropist
- Frederick Mappin (1821–1910), English politician
- Judith Mappin (?–2014), Canadian businesswoman and philanthropist
- Sue Mappin (born 1947), British tennis player

== See also ==
- Mappin baronets
