= Rob Fenwick =

New Zealand environmentalist (1951–2020)

Sir Robert Fenwick KNZM KStJ
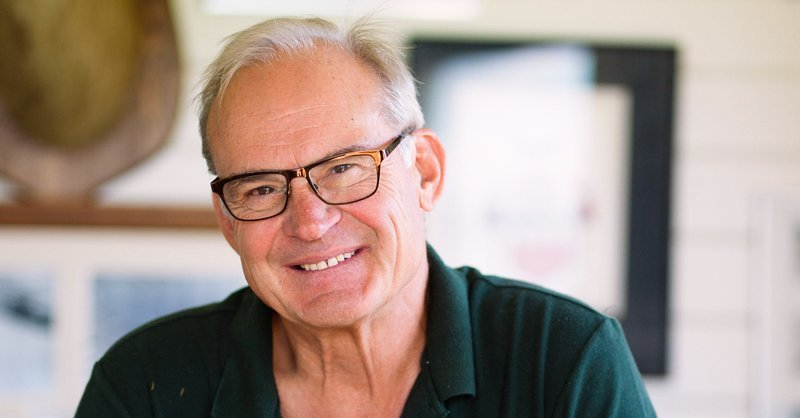
- Born: Robert George Mappin Fenwick; 5 May 1951; Auckland, New Zealand
- Died: 11 March 2020 (aged 68)
- Occupation: Businessman
- Known for: Sustainable business development, Antarctic preservation, New Zealand conservation
- Relatives: Frank Mappin (grandfather); George Fenwick (great-grandfather)

Sir Robert George Mappin Fenwick KNZM KStJ (5 May 1951 – 11 March 2020) was a New Zealand environmentalist, businessman and professional director.

Fenwick co-founded the organic composting service Living Earth Ltd, the NZ Natural bottled water brand and Te Matuku Oysters and held a number of board and advisory panel positions. His conservation and sustainability work included leadership roles in the Predator Free 2050 movement, co-founding the New Zealand Business Council for Sustainable Development and several leadership roles in Antarctica.

Fenwick was knighted in the 2016 Queen's Birthday Honours for "significant contributions to New Zealand’s sustainable development, wildlife protection, waste minimisation, environmental science and Antarctica, and iwi development over the past 30 years". A year earlier, Fenwick received the 2015 Blake Medal, with the Sir Peter Blake Trust acknowledging him as "New Zealand's foremost statesman of sustainability and the environment, and an exceptional leader and motivator in business and governance". Fenwick was a finalist for the 2016 New Zealander of the Year Award and was inducted to the New Zealand Business Hall of Fame in 2016.

== Early life and family history ==
Fenwick was raised in Auckland, New Zealand, son of ophthalmologist George de Lacy Fenwick (died 1994), MD, (son of ophthalmologist George Ernest Oswald Fenwick (1878–1955) OBE) and Ethel Thorpe, daughter of philanthropist Sir Frank Crossley Mappin (6th baronet). His great-grandfather was the newspaper proprietor and editor Sir George Fenwick. Fenwick attended King's College.

=== Arms ===
Fenwick was granted armorial bearings from the Royal College of Arms in 2008.

Notes Arms were granted to Sir Frederick Thorpe Mappin Bt on 23 August 1886; and Arms were also granted to Sir George Fenwick on 27 April 1921. Blazon Quarterly first and fourth Fenwick, namely Per fess dancetty Argent and Gules in chief three Martlets Sable; second and third Mappin, namely Azure on a Bend engrailed between two Boar's heads erased Argent three Lozenges Azure. The Crest of Fenwick is Upon a Wreath of the Colours In front of a Phoenix Sable rising from Flames proper four Mullets Argent.

== Career ==
Fenwick began his career as a journalist with the Auckland Star and Radio Hauraki before co-founding the Public Relations firm Allan, Fenwick, McCully. In 1987, Fenwick co-founded NZ Natural Water Ltd, bottling New Zealand water for export. Fenwick (and partners) established Living Earth Ltd in 1994, New Zealand's first commercial organic waste to compost operation and responsible for diverting 1 million tonnes of waste from landfills for re-use as compost (as of 2010).

In 2000, Fenwick and wife Jennie founded Te Matuku oysters on their Waiheke Island property, situated in the Te Matuku marine reserve, of which Fenwick was an advocate in partnership with the NZ Forest & Bird Society. The oysters are sustainably farmed, supplied to local restaurants and have won critical acclaim.

=== Directorships and advisory roles ===
In 1990, Fenwick commenced a series of consulting roles and professional directorships providing corporate strategy, government relations and communications advisory services to a range of organisations, generally focussing on sustainability and environment issues management.

Notable positions include:

- Chairman, Mai FM Media (1990–2001). A role Fenwick calls his proudest business success for promoting the Maori language.
- Senior Fellow, NZ Institute of Directors (1995 – present)
- Deputy Chairman, TVNZ (2004–2010)
- Chancellor, Order of St John NZ (2006–2008)
- Chairman, Antarctica New Zealand (2008–2015)
- Director, Whai Rawa Ltd the commercial arm of Ngati Whatua o Orakei (2012 – present)
- Founder, Predator Free New Zealand Trust (2013). Trustee (2013 - 2019)
- Member, Air NZ Sustainability Advisory Panel (2015–present)
- Member, Westpac NZ Sustainability & Community Panel (2016–present)
- Director, Te Papa Tongarewa (2016 – present)

== Politics ==
Fenwick was appointed leader of the Progressive Green Party in 1996 and campaigned to create a Maritime Park in the Hauraki Gulf.

In 1998, he was a founding member of the BlueGreens, an environmental policy group within the New Zealand National Party.

Fenwick was involved in the development of New Zealand's waste minimisation strategy and campaigned for the enactment of the Waste Minimisation Act 2008. He was the inaugural chair of the Ministerial Waste Advisory Board, from 2008 to 2014.

== Conservation, sustainability and humanity initiatives ==
Fenwick was highly regarded in New Zealand conservation. He was credited with inspiring the Predator Free New Zealand 2050 movement and was chair of the Predator Free New Zealand Trust – an organisation committed to supporting volunteers involved in pest control. He chaired the Kiwi Trust, a group dedicated to protecting kiwi from extinction and sat on the board of Predator Free 2050 Ltd, the company overseeing Crown investment pertaining to Predator Free 2050 research and project support.

Fenwick undertook conservation efforts specific to his home town of Auckland, New Zealand. In 1992, he and others founded the Motutapu Island Restoration Trust and in 2008 the Fenwick family covenanted their 360 hectare coastal property to expand the Hauraki Gulf Marine Park, of which Fenwick was a key proponent. A forested portion of the Fenwick property was also donated to the Auckland Council as a public walkway.

From 1998 to 2007, Fenwick was director and chairman of the Crown Research Institute Landcare Research, during which time the institute developed the carboNZero emission certification program, of which he was later a director. From 1997 he co-founded and later chaired the New Zealand Business Council for Sustainable Development (later the Sustainable Business Council).

In 1997 Fenwick and businessman colleague John Beattie bought Queen Mary Hospital in Hanmer Springs after the local health authority wanted to close it. Fenwick's motivation was because he had had a close family member treated at Queen Mary, which was a national residential treatment centre for alcoholism and addictions. While the hospital continued to receive government funding Fenwick and Beattie also hoped to attract private fee-paying patients from within New Zealand and overseas. They set up outpatient clinics in other cities and a company which offered addiction and alcoholism treatment programmes to corporate clients. The hospital continued to sustain financial losses going into liquidation and closing in 2003.

Fenwick's other notable conservation, sustainability and humanity work included:

- Trustee, World Wildlife Fund New Zealand (1985–2005)
- Trustee, Air New Zealand Environment Trust (2010–present)
- Special advisor to the Director General, New Zealand Department of Conservation (2010–2015)
- Chairman, Fred Hollows Foundation (2010–2014)
- Trustee, Motu: Economic and Public Policy Research (2011–2015)
- Board member, NEXT Foundation (2014–present)
- Chairman, Sustainable Seas National Science Challenge (2015–present)
- Board member, Deep South National Science Challenge (2015–present)

=== Antarctica ===
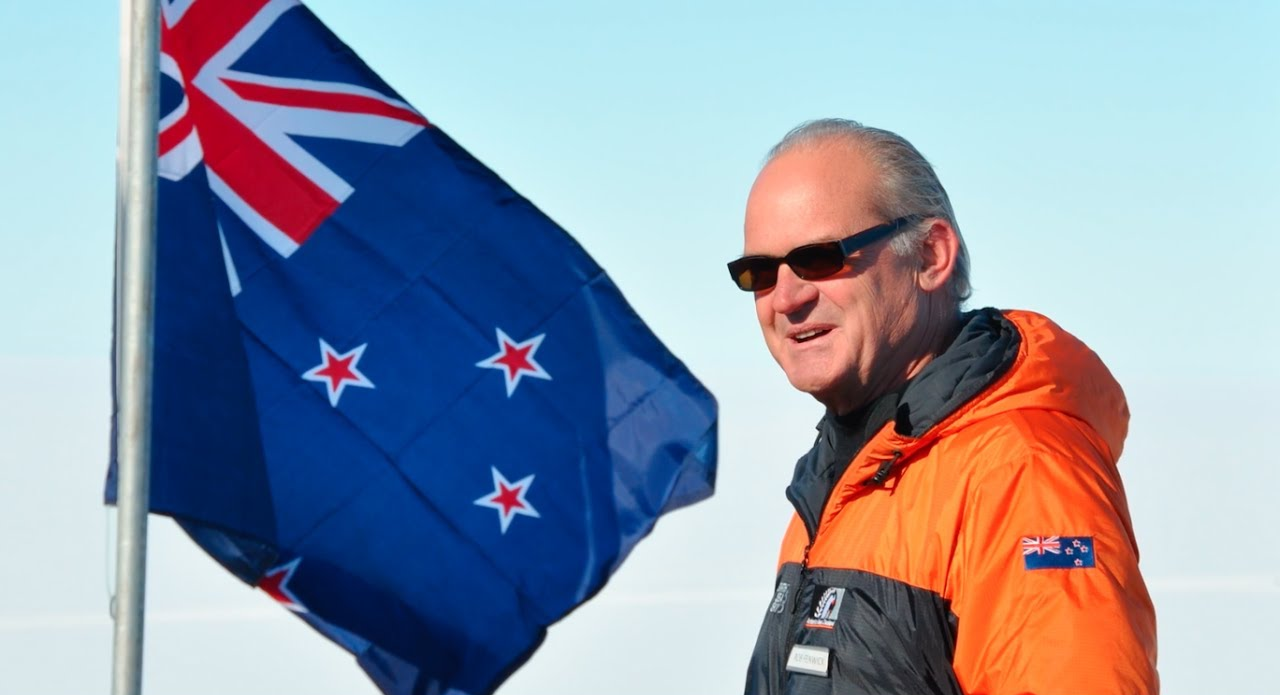
Sir Rob Fenwick, then Chairman of Antarctica NZ

North & South Magazine wrote that “Rob Fenwick has had more impact on Antarctica than possibly any other New Zealander”.

In 1993, Fenwick launched an international campaign to preserve the Scott and Shackleton Antarctic huts. He was later elected and served as chairman of the Antarctic Heritage Trust from 1996 to 2007. Following the completion of the project, Fenwick was invited to chair the board of Antarctica New Zealand. During his term the agency constructed wind powered turbines to supply energy to the New Zealand and US research stations and the Hillary Science Centre was completed at Scott Base. In 2012 he established the privately funded Antarctic Research Institute – partnering with research agencies to expand climate change research on the continent.

The Fenwick Ice Piedmont was named in his honour by the New Zealand Geographic Board in acknowledgment of his efforts.

== Honours and awards ==
- Knight of the Order of St John (2005)
- Companion of the New Zealand Order of Merit, for services to conservation and the community, in the 2008 Queen's Birthday Honours
- Honorary doctorate, Lincoln University (2009)
- Sir Peter Blake medallist (2015)
- Knight Companion of the New Zealand Order of Merit – for services to business and conservation (2016)
- Finalist, New Zealander of the Year (2016)
- Inducted into the New Zealand Business Hall of Fame (2016)
- Winner, Kea World Class NZ Awards (2017)

== Personal life ==
In 1974, Fenwick married firstly Juileen Adams; they had a daughter and, later, divorced in 1986. He married secondly Jennifer ("Jennie") Anne Beatty, a yoga teacher, with whom he had two more daughters. He and his family lived on Waiheke Island.
