= Godfrey Foljambe =

English cricketer

- Lord Hawke's XI in India 1892-93. Foljambe is standing at the far right.

Personal information
- Full name: Godfrey Acheson Thornhagh Foljambe
- Born: 2 June 1876; Marylebone, London, England
- Died: 16 March 1942 (aged 72); Lizard, Cornwall, England
- Batting: Unknown
- Bowling: Left-arm medium
- Relatives: George Foljambe (brother); Edward Acheson (uncle); Lord Acheson (uncle); Edmond Foljambe (nephew); Henry Wright (brother-in-law)

Domestic team information
- Years: Team
- 1892–1893: Marylebone Cricket Club
- 1899: Cambridgeshire

Career statistics
Competition	First-class
Matches	5
Runs scored	97
Batting average	12.12
100s/50s	–/–
Top score	34
Balls bowled	379
Wickets	9
Bowling average	16.11
5 wickets in innings	–
10 wickets in match	–
Best bowling	4/32
Catches/stumpings	2/–
- Source: Cricinfo, 19 July 2019

Godfrey Acheson Thornhagh Foljambe JP (21 October 1869 – 16 March 1942) was an English first-class cricketer.

The son of Francis Foljambe and his wife, Gertrude Emily Acheson, Foljambe was born at Marylebone in October 1869. He was educated at Eton College, before going up to Trinity College, Cambridge, where he graduated in 1892. He made his debut in first-class cricket for the Marylebone Cricket Club (MCC) against Cambridge University at Fenner's in 1892. He toured Ceylon and India with Lord Hawke's XI in 1892–93, making three first-class appearances on the tour. He made his final first-class appearance in May 1893 for the MCC against Cambridge University. In his five first-class matches, Foljambe scored 97 runs with a high score of 34. With his left-arm medium pace bowling, he took 9 wickets at an average of 16.11, with best figures of 4 for 32. In addition to playing first-class cricket, he also played minor counties cricket for Cambridgeshire in 1899, making a single appearance in the Minor Counties Championship.

He later served as a justice of the peace for Herefordshire. Foljambe died in March 1942 at Lizard, Cornwall. He was married to Judith Frances Wright, the daughter of FitzHerbert Wright. His brother George was also a first-class cricketer, as were his uncles Edward Acheson and Lord Acheson.
