= Gareth Morgan (economist) =

New Zealand businessman (born 1953)

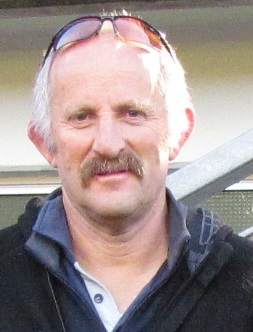
- Morgan in 2012

1st Leader of The Opportunities Party
- In office 4 November 2016 – 14 December 2017
- Deputy: Geoff Simmons; Teresa Moore
- Succeeded by: Geoff Simmons

Personal details
- Born: Gareth Huw Morgan; 17 February 1953 (age 73) Putāruru, New Zealand
- Party: TOP (2016–2019)
- Spouse: Joanne Morgan
- Relations: Sam Morgan (son)
- Children: 4
- Education: Massey University; Victoria University
- Occupation: Economist, Investment manager
- Website: morganfoundation.org.nz

Gareth Huw Morgan (born 17 February 1953) is a New Zealand businessman, economist, investment manager, philanthropist, public commentator and former political figure.

== Early life and education ==
Morgan was born in Putāruru, New Zealand, to Welsh immigrants Roderic and Mary Morgan. He was the second of five children and the first to be born in New Zealand. Morgan attended Putaruru High School. He then attended Massey University for four years gaining a BA(Hons) in economics. In 1982, he graduated from Victoria University of Wellington with a PhD in economics.

== Work ==
=== Career and business ===
Morgan worked for the Reserve Bank of New Zealand in the early 1980s, before founding economics forecasting company Infometrics Limited in 1983. That company became one of New Zealand's largest independent economics consultancy and forecasting businesses and for 18 years while under Morgan's leadership (until the end of the 1990s) maintained a regular national circuit of business and public speaking engagements focussed on raising the economics literacy of businesspeople and householders.

In 1984, he and business partner Andrew Gawith launched a twice weekly horse racing form guide, Bettor Informed, based on econometric modelling of all 7,500 gallopers on the New Zealand scene. The publication sought to identify the fair dividend for each horse and to instruct its readers when the odds being paid at the tote were a good return compared to the horse's actual chances of winning in that field. This publication was later sold to Independent Newspapers Limited, the owners of competing titles Best Bets and Turf Digest.

In 2000, Morgan established Gareth Morgan Investments, a personal investment portfolio management service. When the New Zealand Government initiated KiwiSaver in 2007, Gareth Morgan KiwiSaver Limited launched the Gareth Morgan KiwiSaver Scheme.

Morgan is well known for activism against New Zealand's financial services industry. Morgan says that he has been persistent in exposing and criticising the sector, challenging the financial sector to produce safer and more ethical products.

Morgan and his wife Joanne were early investors in Trade Me, founded by his son Sam Morgan. They were paid NZ$50m for their shares when Fairfax Media bought Trade Me in 2006.

Morgan was a member of the Government appointed Capital Markets Task Force (2008–2009) and the Tax Working Group (2009). He is the chair of the Motor Cycle Safety Levy Advisory Council, Patron of Wing 256 NZ Police Recruits, and was North & South's New Zealander of the Year in 2007.

In 2011, as part of a business consortium, Morgan and six other Wellington businessmen joined to take over the licence of Wellington Phoenix FC, the only professional soccer team in New Zealand after its owner was declared bankrupt.

=== UNICEF Projects ===
Along with his wife Jo, Gareth Morgan has been a UNICEF NZ Ambassador and major donor since 2007 and has instigated a number of specific programmes in conjunction with UNICEF since that time. They include:

- A water project in Tanzania where the Morgans matched a NZ public appeal dollar for dollar for funding to install boreholes, wells and water tanks in 29 villages, and provide basic hygiene education, directly benefiting over 65,000 people.
- Repairs to 44 tsunami-damaged schools in the Solomon Islands where the Morgans matched a NZ public appeal dollar for dollar. The programme will ensure that 5,400 children have access to safe drinking water, hygienic toilet facilities, modern and relevant teaching and learning materials, and safe bright classrooms.
- Boosting funding for a programme focused on the social adjustment of children in the slums of Bogota, Colombia, through funding of the game of peace, Golombiao. This programme will directly benefit 4,000 children, teaching them conflict management skills, promoting peaceful co-existence and preventing their attachment to violence and their participation in illegal armed groups. The Morgans matched dollar for dollar a public appeal run in Bogota for the initiative.
- Boosting funding for a programme of assisting displaced indigenous communities around Asuncion, the capital of Paraguay. This programme will provide improved access to health, education and family protection of 670 children and adolescents working on the streets.

=== The Kiwi Heroes Programme ===
Since 2006 Gareth and Joanne have supported the work of a number of New Zealanders involved in significant foreign aid around the world. They include:

- Edric Baker – an inspirational medical doctor who has worked in northern Bangladesh for over 20 years, establishing the Kailakuri Health Centre.
- Scott and Tracey Dumbleton – a married ophthalmic team who worked at the Gilgit Eye Hospital in remote northern Pakistan.
- Tristan de Chalain and the plastic surgery reconstruction team at Middlemore Hospital who travel to the Philippines every year to surgically repair cleft lips and palates for affected underprivileged Filipino children.
- Judy and Ralph Duley – a retired couple, physical therapists, who work with orphaned disabled children in Western China.
- Rachael Hughes – a woman who has dedicated a decade to assisting the street-kids of Vladivostok, protecting them from violence and helping educate them so they can lead fulfilling lives.
- Mary Taylor and her project to help Sri Lankan victims of the 2004 Boxing Day tsunami re-establish their fishing businesses and get back on their feet.

=== Environmental ===
- 2007 – Gareth and Jo provided the Island Bay National Wildlife Refuge with funding to prevent a property developer encroaching on a native bush area, instead allowing the land to be turned into a reserve for the benefit of the whole community.
- 2010 – Gareth and Jo provided Victoria University's Antarctic Research Centre funding to hire two researchers to work on aspects of climate change in Antarctica.
- 2011 – Gareth helped Wellington Zoo fund the recovery and rehabilitation of Happy Feet, a stranded emperor penguin. He did this by matching dollar for dollar a public appeal for funding.
- 2011 – Gareth organised a major scientific and public awareness programme on the environment and territorial threats to Antarctica. This programme centres around a voyage from Bluff to Scott Base taking place in February 2012. On board was a complement of New Zealand's top scientists and a range of communicators chosen from across New Zealand. The objective was to raise the New Zealanders' awareness of the race for resources, the sensitivity of the continent to climate change and the threat to biodiversity of our subantarctic islands from overfishing, marine pollution and climate change.
- 2013 – Morgan gained international attention for his call for New Zealand's domestic cat population to be eradicated, or rather not replaced when they die, as a means of protecting the country's wildlife. Although the scientific basis for this possible action is disputed, some conservationists were sympathetic. Euthanasia "is an option", according to Morgan's website dedicated to this issue, "Cats To Go".
- 2013 – Gareth co-founded Predator Free New Zealand Trust alongside Rob Fenwick and others. He is still a trustee for the Trust (2018–present).

=== Public art ===
In 2015 Morgan proposed to install a kinetic sculpture near his bach in Tauranga, but the city council voted against it. In 2022, Morgan placed a rainbow-coloured bridge in the land he owns at Paekākāriki Hill, which does not cross over anything but is visible from the Transmission Gully Motorway. In late 2023 an oversized orange park bench and a white feather sculpture by Neil Dawson was placed on the land, which can also be seen from the motorway. Also visible from the motorway is an orange kinetic sculpture by Phil Price.

== Political career ==
In 2016 Gareth Morgan launched his own political party, The Opportunities Party (TOP), to contest the 2017 New Zealand general election. The party won 2.4% of the party vote and consequently did not reach the necessary 5% threshold under MMP to win seats in Parliament. Some electoral seats were contested but the party was also unsuccessful in those contests.

In December 2017, three months after the election, Morgan resigned as leader and the party's deputy leader Geoff Simmons and two candidates also stepped down from their roles. Morgan said the party would contest the 2020 election but he would not lead it.

On 9 July 2018, Morgan announced that the board of The Opportunities Party had decided to dissolve the party since they concluded that it lacked the time and resources needed to contest the 2020 general election. In late July 2018, Morgan announced that the party's board was reconsidering their decision to dissolve the party after receiving expressions of interests from sympathetic individuals. He also indicated he was willing to bankroll a "credible successor" provided they remained true to the TOP's manifesto.

On 31 March 2019, Gareth Morgan resigned from all remaining positions he held with the party, quitting it entirely.

== Personal life ==
He married Joanne Baird from Invercargill in 1975. They have four children: two daughters and two sons.

Morgan and his wife Joanne have ridden motorcycles in every continent in the world, as part of their "World by Bike" expeditions. His motorcycle trip through North Korea was documented in a video posted on the Vice YouTube channel in 2013.

== Publications ==
Morgan has written numerous public commentaries and books on issues of public interest.

- 2009 – Poles Apart – a book surveying the state of the science around the phenomenon of anthropogenic climate change. The book won a Royal Society Prize for Excellence.
- 2010 – Health Cheque – a book assessing the state of New Zealand's public health system, international benchmarking of its excellence and formulating suggestions for improvement. The technique involved a combination of literature research and extensive interviewing of health professionals (clinical and management) working throughout New Zealand's public health system.
- 2011 – The Big Kahuna – this book investigated the contribution that unpaid work makes to New Zealand society, and the consequences of measures of economic production not explicitly recognising such contributions – from community service, to care of the young and elderly. It recommended a series of policy responses to correct the omission.
- 2011 – Hook, Line and Blinkers – a book assessing the state of the world fish stocks and then appraising the state of fisheries management in New Zealand. The purpose is to identify where the management regime can be improved to ensure that our grandchildren's grandchildren can fish sustainably.
- 2013 – Appetite for Destruction: Food – the Good, the Bad and the Fatal (with Geoff Simmons) – a book which analyses the pitfalls of contemporary processed food and the problem with contemporary diets more generally.
