= 1876 East Retford by-election =

UK Parliamentary by-election

The 1876 East Retford by-election was fought on 24 February 1876. The by-election was fought due to the death of the incumbent Conservative MP, George Monckton-Arundell. It was won by the Conservative candidate William Beckett-Denison.

East Retford by-election, 1876
Party	Candidate	Votes	%	±%
Conservative	William Beckett-Denison	3,538	51.3	N/A
Liberal	H F Bristowe	3,351	48.7	N/A
Majority		187	1.6	N/A
Turnout		6,889	84.7	N/A
Conservative hold		Swing	N/A	
