= Predator Free New Zealand Trust =

Conservation non-profit

Predator Free NZ Trust
- Predator Free New Zealand Trust
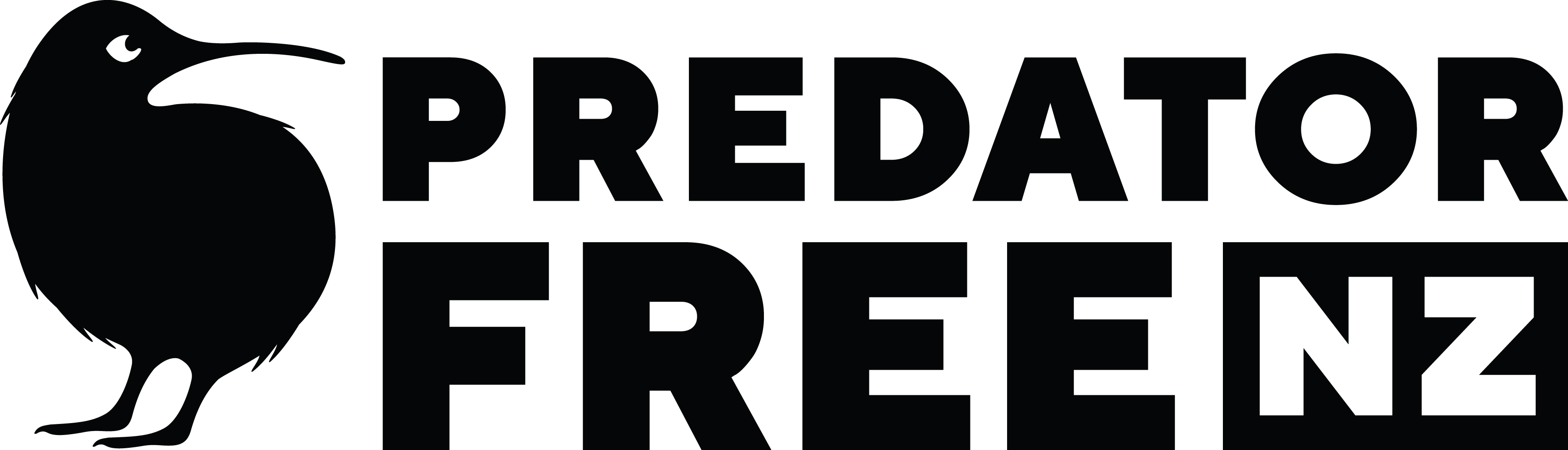
- Abbreviation: PFNZ
- Formation: 2013; 13 years ago
- Type: Non-governmental organisation
- Legal status: Charity
- Location: Wellington, New Zealand
- Chief executive: Jessi Morgan
- Website: Official website

The Predator Free New Zealand Trust is a charitable organisation established in 2013 by Rob Fenwick, Gareth Morgan and others with the mission to advocate for community-led conservation efforts aimed at eradicating introduced mammalian predators from New Zealand. This initiative is part of the broader Predator Free 2050 vision, which seeks to create a predator free environment for the country's unique native species by the year 2050.

== Objectives and vision ==
The Trust's primary goal is to connect and energise communities across New Zealand to participate in predator control activities. It emphasises the importance of local involvement in conservation efforts, encouraging individuals and community groups to engage in monitoring, trapping, and educating others about the impacts of invasive species on native wildlife. The Trust operates under the belief that collaborative action among government agencies, non-governmental organisations (NGOs), iwi (Māori tribes), and local communities is essential for achieving a sustainable predator free environment.

== Community engagement ==
The Predator Free New Zealand Trust supports over 2,000 community groups involved in predator control initiatives throughout the country. These groups participate in various activities including backyard trapping, habitat restoration, and public education campaigns. The Trust provides resources, training, and guidance to empower communities to take effective action against predators such as rats, stoats, and possums, which pose significant threats to New Zealand's native fauna.

== Collaboration with Predator Free 2050 ==
The Trust plays a crucial role in the Predator Free 2050 initiative, which aims to eradicate introduced predators from New Zealand’s mainland and offshore islands. This ambitious project requires substantial investment and innovation in pest control methods.

The Trust also collaborated with Predator Free 2050 Ltd, a joint venture supported by the New Zealand government that focused on research and development of new technologies for predator management until the government disestablished it in August 2025.
