= Francis Foljambe (Liberal politician) =

British politician (1830–1917)

The Right Honourable Francis John Foljambe PC
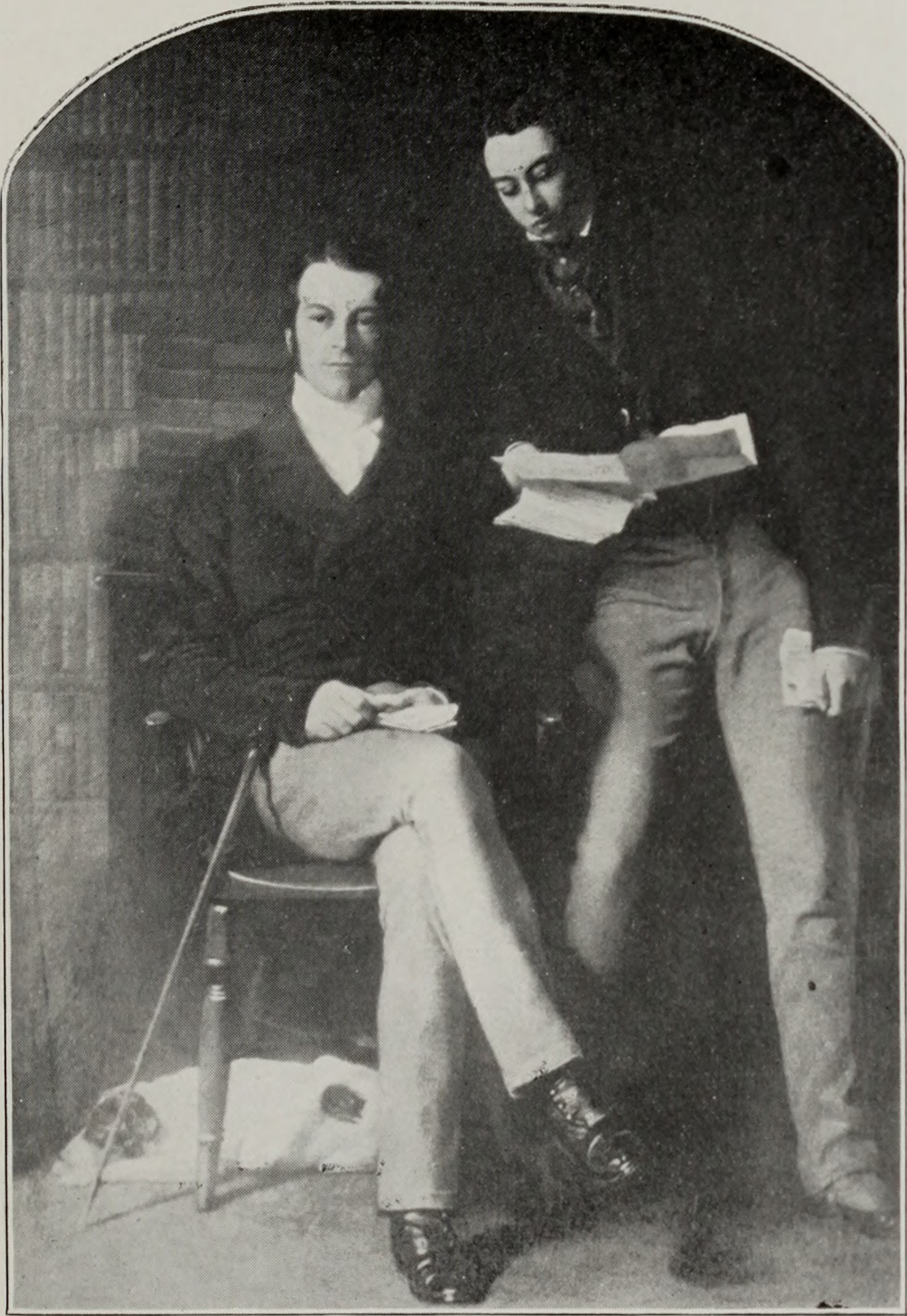
- Savile and his father George, portrait by Robert Thorburn

Member of Parliament for East Retford
- In office 1857–1885 Serving with The Viscount Galway, William Beckett-Denison, Frederick Mappin
- Preceded by: William Duncombe; The Viscount Galway
- Succeeded by: Constituency abolished

Personal details
- Born: Francis John Savile Foljambe; 9 April 1830 Worksop, Nottinghamshire
- Died: 5 February 1917 (aged 86)
- Party: Liberal
- Spouse: Lady Gertrude Emily Acheson (m. 1856)
- Relations: Cecil Foljambe, 1st Earl of Liverpool (half-brother); Edmond Foljambe (grandson)
- Parent(s): George Savile Foljambe; Harriet Emily Mary Milner
- Education: Eton College
- Alma mater: Christ Church, Oxford

Francis John Savile Foljambe (9 April 1830 – 5 February 1917) was a British Liberal Member of Parliament.

== Early life ==
Foljambe was born at Osberton Hall, near Worksop, Nottinghamshire on 9 April 1830. He was the eldest son and heir of George Savile Foljambe and Harriet Emily Mary Milner (a daughter of Sir William Milner, 4th Baronet). After his mother's death, his father remarried to Selina, Viscountess Milton, widow of William Charles FitzWilliam, Viscount Milton (son of the 5th Earl Fitzwilliam) and daughter of Charles Jenkinson, 3rd Earl of Liverpool. From this marriage, he had a younger half-brother, fellow Liberal politician Cecil Foljambe, 1st Earl of Liverpool, and a step-sister, Hon. Mary Selina Charlotte Fitzwilliam, who later married Henry Portman, 2nd Viscount Portman.

He was educated at Eton and Christ Church, Oxford.

== Career ==
Foljambe was elected as a member of parliament for East Retford in the 1857 general election. He was re-elected at every general election until the 1885 election, when the seat was abolished. He owned about 14,500 acres (59 km^{2}) of land and was a member of Brooks's. He was appointed a member of the Privy Council in 1895.

In 1889, he succeeded Antony Gibbs as the High Sheriff of Nottinghamshire and was, in turn, succeeded by Sir Charles Seely.

== Personal life ==
On 20 February 1856, he married Lady Gertrude Emily Acheson, eldest daughter of Archibald Acheson, 3rd Earl of Gosford and Lady Theodosia Brabazon (daughter of John Brabazon, 10th Earl of Meath). Together, they had three sons, including:

- George Savile Foljambe (1856–1920), a cricketer who married Dora Margaret Warre, a daughter of Dr. Edmond Warre, Headmaster of Eton.
- Godfrey Acheson Thornhagh Foljambe (1869–1942), also a cricketer who married Judith Frances Wright, the daughter of FitzHerbert Wright and sister of H. FitzHerbert Wright.
- Hubert Francis Fitzwilliam Brabazon Foljambe (1872–1914), who married Gladys Bewicke-Copley, a daughter of Gen. Robert Calverley Alington Bewicke-Copley of Sprotborough Hall in 1909. He was killed in action during the Great War at the First Battle of the Aisne.

Foljambe died on 5 February 1917. His widow Lady Gertrude Foljambe died on 17 December 1927.

=== Descendants ===
Through his eldest son, he was a grandfather of cricketer Edmond Walter Savile Foljambe (1890–1960), a soldier during World War I who married Judith Harriet Wright (daughter of the first-class cricketer H. FitzHerbert Wright, who was also the brother-in-law of his uncle Godfrey) in 1940.

Parliament of the United Kingdom
Preceded by William Duncombe; The Viscount Galway	Member of Parliament for East Retford; 1857–1885; With: The Viscount Galway 1857–1876; William Beckett-Denison 1876–1880; Frederick Mappin 1880–1885	Constituency abolished
Honorary titles
Preceded by Antony Gibbs	High Sheriff of Nottinghamshire; 1889	Succeeded by Sir Charles Seely
