= Edmond Foljambe =

English cricketer and British Army officer

Personal information
- Full name: Edmond Walter Savile Foljambe
- Born: 19 September 1890; Southwell, Nottinghamshire, England
- Died: 22 August 1960 (aged 69); Walkley, Yorkshire, England
- Batting: Unknown
- Relatives: George Foljambe (father); Godfrey Foljambe (uncle); Lord Acheson (great-uncle); Edward Acheson (great-uncle); Henry Wright (father-in-law)

Domestic team information
- Years: Team
- 1912: Oxford University

Career statistics
Competition	First-class
Matches	3
Runs scored	91
Batting average	18.20
100s/50s	–/–
Top score	38
Catches/stumpings	1/–
- Source: Cricinfo, 3 June 2019

Edmond Walter Savile Foljambe DL (19 September 1890 – 22 August 1960) was an English first-class cricketer and British Army officer. Foljambe played first-class cricket for Oxford University and the Free Foresters in 1912, before serving in the First World War with the Rifle Brigade.

== Life and military career ==
Foljambe was born at Southwell in September 1890 to the first-class cricketer George Foljambe. He was educated at Eton College, where he was a part of the Eton College contingent of the Officers' Training Corps. From Eton he went up to Christ Church, Oxford, where he also served as a second lieutenant with the Oxford University contingent of the Officers' Training Corps. While at Oxford he made two appearances in first-class cricket for Oxford University in 1912, against H. K. Foster's XI and the Marylebone Cricket Club, as well as appearing for the Free Foresters against Oxford University. He joined the Rifle Brigade in January 1913, and was promoted to the rank of lieutenant in October 1913. He served during the First World War, seeing action at the Battle of Le Cateau in August 1914, where he was reported as missing in action, only to reappear. He was promoted to the rank of captain in June 1915. He ended the war at the Southern Army Infantry School. Following the war, he was made a deputy lieutenant for Nottinghamshire in April 1925. He married Judith Harriet Wright (daughter of the first-class cricketer Henry Wright) in 1940. Foljambe died at Walkley in August 1960. His grandfather was the Liberal Member of Parliament Francis Foljambe.
