= Who? Who? ministry =

Government of the United Kingdom

First Derby–Disraeli ministry
- 1852
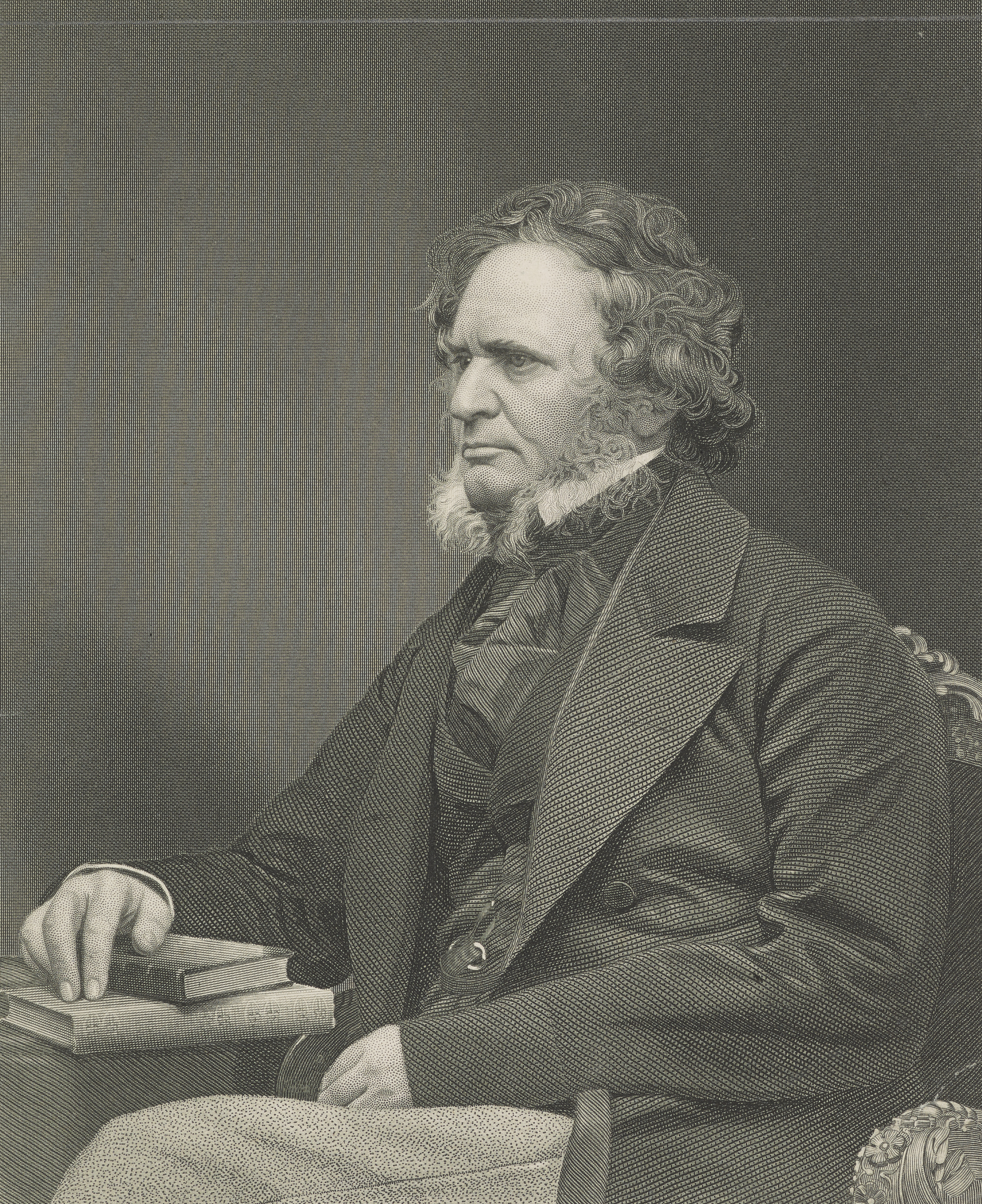
- Lord Derby
- Date formed: 23 February 1852
- Date dissolved: 17 December 1852

People and organisations
- Monarch: Victoria
- Prime Minister: Edward Smith-Stanley, 14th Earl of Derby
- Member party: Conservative Party
- Status in legislature: Minority
- Opposition party: Whig Party
- Opposition leaders: Lord John Russell

History
- Elections: 1847 general election; 1852 general election
- Predecessor: First Russell ministry
- Successor: Aberdeen ministry

Edward Smith-Stanley, 14th Earl of Derby led the "Who? Who?" ministry, a short-lived British Conservative government which was in power for a matter of months in 1852. Lord Derby was Prime Minister and Benjamin Disraeli served as Chancellor of the Exchequer. It marked the first time the protectionist wing of the Conservative Party had taken office since the Corn Laws schism of 1846. It is also called the First Derby–Disraeli ministry.

Early in 1852 Arthur Wellesley, 1st Duke of Wellington, by then very deaf, gave Derby's first government its nickname by shouting "Who? Who?" as the list of inexperienced cabinet ministers was read out in the House of Lords.

== History ==
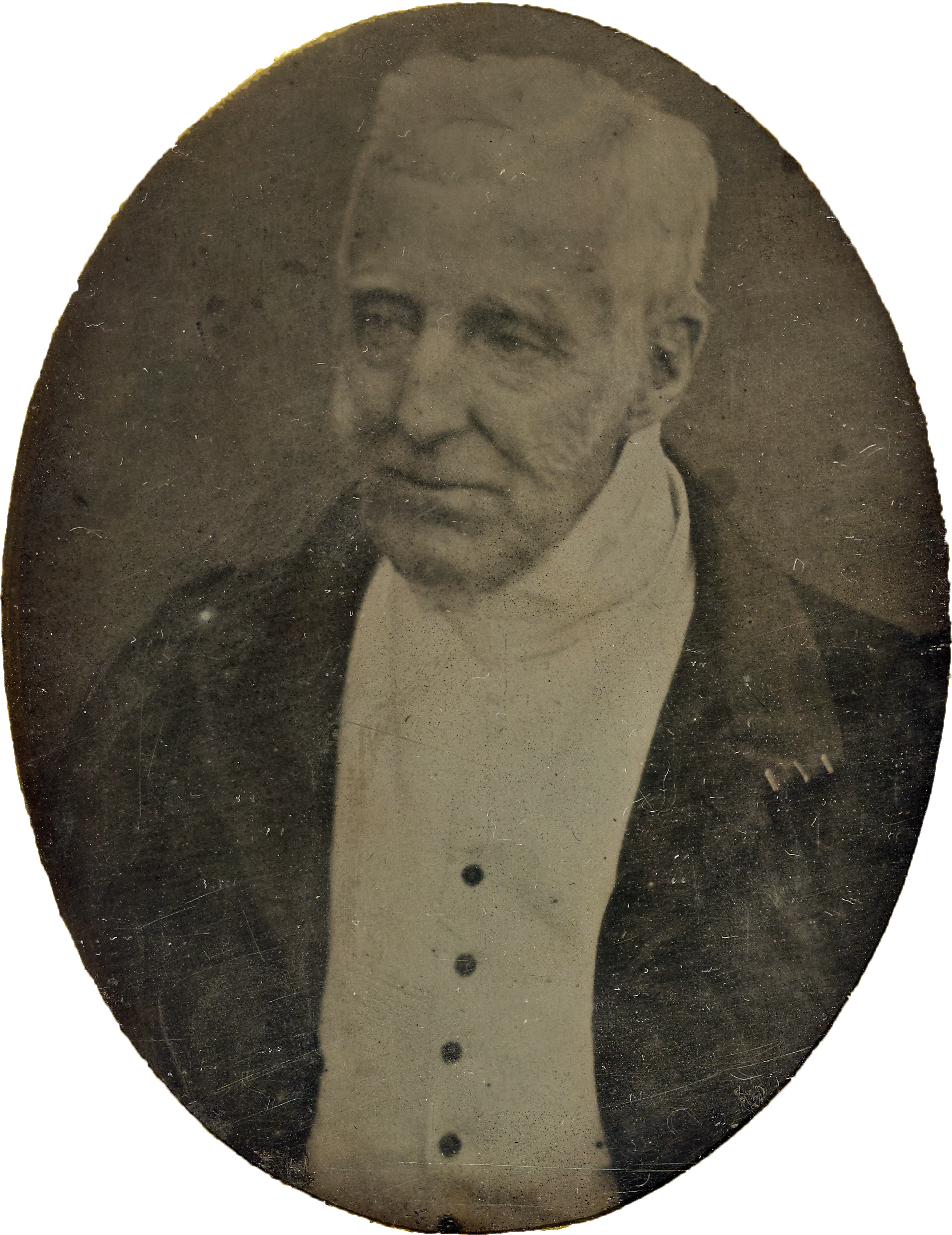
Former Prime Minister Wellington (pictured in 1844) gave the ministry its name by shouting "Who? Who?" as each new cabinet member was announced in the House of Lords. He died two months before the ministry collapsed.

After the fall of Lord John Russell's Whig government in early 1852, the Conservative leader Lord Derby formed a government. The Conservatives had been weakened by the defection of the Peelites, and many of the new Cabinet ministers were men of little experience. The government became known as the "Who? Who?" Ministry after Wellington's comments, due to the lack of prominence of its ministers. The government was in a significant minority, and lasted less than a year, collapsing in December. The Whigs and Peelites then formed a coalition government under the Peelite leader Lord Aberdeen.

Though the government had little impact, it attracted derision through its plethora of new political names, which demonstrated the relative inexperience of the party. Only four members of the Cabinet (Derby himself, St Leonards, Lonsdale, and Herries) were existing Privy Councillors and many others were complete political unknowns.

== Cabinet ==
Office	Minister	Tenure
First Lord of the Treasury; Leader of the House of Lords	Edward Smith-Stanley, 14th Earl of Derby	February–December 1852
Lord Chancellor	Edward Burtenshaw Sugden, 1st Baron St Leonards	February–December 1852
Lord President of the Council	William Lowther, 2nd Earl of Lonsdale	February–December 1852
Lord Privy Seal	James Brownlow William Gascoyne-Cecil, 2nd Marquess of Salisbury	February–December 1852
Home Secretary	Spencer Horatio Walpole	February–December 1852
Foreign Secretary	James Howard Harris, 3rd Earl of Malmesbury	February–December 1852
Secretary of State for War and the Colonies	Sir John Pakington, 1st Baronet	February–December 1852
First Lord of the Admiralty	Algernon Percy, 4th Duke of Northumberland	February–December 1852
President of the Board of Control	John Charles Herries	February–December 1852
Chancellor of the Exchequer; Leader of the House of Commons	Benjamin Disraeli	February–December 1852
President of the Board of Trade	J. W. Henley	February–December 1852
First Commissioner of Works	Lord John Manners	February–December 1852
Postmaster-General	Charles Philip Yorke, 4th Earl of Hardwicke	February–December 1852

== List of ministers ==
Cabinet members are listed in bold face.

Office	Minister	Tenure	Notes
Prime Minister, First Lord of the Treasury and Leader of the House of Lords	**Edward Smith-Stanley, 14th Earl of Derby**	23 February 1852 – 17 December 1852	
Chancellor of the Exchequer and Leader of the House of Commons	**Benjamin Disraeli**	27 February 1852	
Parliamentary Secretary to the Treasury	William Forbes Mackenzie	2 March 1852	
Financial Secretary to the Treasury	George Alexander Hamilton	2 March 1852	
Junior Lords of the Treasury	Richard Temple-Grenville, Marquess of Chandos	28 February 1852 – 17 December 1852	
Junior Lords of the Treasury	Lord Henry Lennox	28 February 1852 – 17 December 1852	
Junior Lords of the Treasury	Thomas Bateson	28 February 1852 – 17 December 1852	
Lord Chancellor	**Edward Sugden, 1st Baron St Leonards**	27 February 1852	
Lord President of the Council	**William Lowther, 2nd Earl of Lonsdale**	27 February 1852	
Lord Privy Seal	**James Gascoyne-Cecil, 2nd Marquess of Salisbury**	27 February 1852	
Secretary of State for the Home Department	**Spencer Horatio Walpole**	27 February 1852	
Under-Secretary of State for the Home Department	Sir William Joliffe, 1st Baronet	27 February 1852	
Secretary of State for Foreign Affairs	**James Harris, 3rd Earl of Malmesbury**	27 February 1852	
Under-Secretary of State for Foreign Affairs	Lord Edward Stanley	18 May 1852	
Secretary of State for War and the Colonies	**Sir John Pakington, 1st Baronet**	17 February 1852	
Under-Secretary of State for War and the Colonies	John Cuffe, 3rd Earl of Desart	2 March 1852	
First Lord of the Admiralty	**Algernon Percy, 4th Duke of Northumberland**	28 February 1852	
First Secretary of the Admiralty	Augustus Stafford	3 March 1852	
Civil Lord of the Admiralty	Arthur Duncombe	28 February 1852	
President of the Board of Control	**J. C. Herries**	28 February 1852	
Joint Secretaries to the Board of Control	Henry Baillie	1 March 1852 – 17 December 1852	
Joint Secretaries to the Board of Control	Charles Bruce	1 March 1852 – 17 December 1852	
Postmaster-General	**Charles Yorke, 4th Earl of Hardwicke**	1 March 1852	
President of the Board of Trade	**J. W. Henley**	17 February 1852	
Vice-President of the Board of Trade	Charles Edward Abbot, 2nd Baron Colchester	27 February 1852	
First Commissioner of Works	**Lord John Manners**	4 March 1852	
Chief Secretary for Ireland	Richard Bourke, Baron Naas	1 March 1852	
Lord Lieutenant of Ireland	Archibald Montgomerie, 13th Earl of Eglinton	1 March 1852	
Chancellor of the Duchy of Lancaster	Robert Adam Christopher	1 March 1852	
Master-General of the Ordnance	Henry Hardinge, 1st Viscount Hardinge	1 March 1852	
Master-General of the Ordnance	Lord Fitzroy Somerset	30 September 1852	created Lord Raglan 20 October 1852
Surveyor-General of the Ordnance	George Berkeley	18 June 1852	
Clerk of the Ordnance	Francis Plunkett Dunne	5 March 1852	
Storekeeper of the Ordnance	Thomas Hastings	25 July 1845	continued in office
Paymaster General	Charles Abbot, 2nd Baron Colchester	28 February 1852	
President of the Poor Law Board	Sir John Trollope, 7th Baronet	1 March 1852	
Parliamentary Secretary to the Poor Law Board	Frederick Knight	3 March 1852	
Secretary at War	William Beresford	28 February 1852	
Attorney General	Frederic Thesiger	27 February 1852	
Solicitor General	Fitzroy Kelly	27 February 1852	
Judge Advocate General	George Bankes	28 February 1852	
Lord Advocate	Adam Anderson	28 February 1852	
Lord Advocate	John Inglis	19 May 1852	
Solicitor General for Scotland	John Inglis	28 February 1852	
Solicitor General for Scotland	Charles Neaves	24 May 1852	
Attorney General for Ireland	Joseph Napier	February 1852	
Solicitor General for Ireland	James Whiteside	February 1852	
Lord Steward of the Household	James Graham, 4th Duke of Montrose	27 February 1852	
Lord Chamberlain of the Household	Brownlow Cecil, 2nd Marquess of Exeter	27 February 1852	
Vice-Chamberlain of the Household	Orlando Bridgeman, Viscount Newport	5 March 1852	
Master of the Horse	George Child-Villiers, 5th Earl of Jersey	1 March 1852	
Treasurer of the Household	Lord Claud Hamilton	27 February 1852	
Comptroller of the Household	George Weld-Forester	27 February 1852	
Captain of the Gentlemen-at-Arms	John Montagu, 7th Earl of Sandwich	27 February 1852	
Captain of the Yeomen of the Guard	Lord William FitzGerald-de Ros	27 February 1852	
Master of the Buckhounds	James St Clair-Erskine, 3rd Earl of Rosslyn	28 February 1852	
Chief Equerry and Clerk Marshal	Lord Charles Colville of Culross	28 February 1852	
Mistress of the Robes	Anne Murray, Duchess of Atholl	16 March 1852	
Lords in Waiting	George Douglas, 17th Earl of Morton	2 March 1852 – 17 December 1852	
Lords in Waiting	James Grimston, 2nd Earl of Verulam	2 March 1852 – 17 December 1852	
Lords in Waiting	Cornwallis Maude, 3rd Viscount Hawarden	2 March 1852 – 17 December 1852	
Lords in Waiting	George Monckton-Arundell, 6th Viscount Galway	2 March 1852 – 17 December 1852	
Lords in Waiting	Edward Crofton, 2nd Baron Crofton	2 March 1852 – 17 December 1852	
Lords in Waiting	Henry Hepburne-Scott, 7th Lord Polwarth	2 March 1852 – 17 December 1852	
Lords in Waiting	Henry Chetwynd-Talbot, 3rd Earl Talbot	2 March 1852 – 17 December 1852	

== Bibliography ==
- C. Cook and B. Keith, British Historical Facts 1830–1900

Preceded by First Russell ministry	Government of the United Kingdom; 1852	Succeeded by Aberdeen ministry
