= Arthur Duncombe (Royal Navy officer) =

Royal Navy Admiral and Conservative politician (1806–1889)

Admiral The Honourable Arthur Duncombe
- Born: 24 March 1806
- Died: 6 February 1889 (aged 82)
- Military career
- Allegiance: United Kingdom
- Branch: Royal Navy
- Rank: Admiral

Admiral Arthur Duncombe (24 March 1806 – 6 February 1889) was a British naval commander and Conservative politician.

== Background ==
Duncombe was a younger son of Charles Duncombe, 1st Baron Feversham, and his wife Lady Charlotte, daughter of William Legge, 2nd Earl of Dartmouth.

== Career ==
Duncombe served in the Royal Navy and achieved the rank of admiral. Apart from his naval career he also sat as Member of Parliament for East Retford between 1830 and 1831 and 1835 and 1852 and the East Riding of Yorkshire between 1852 and 1868.

He served in the short-lived 1852 Conservative administration of the Earl of Derby as a Fourth Naval Lord. Duncombe lived at Kilnwick Percy Hall at Pocklington in the East Riding of Yorkshire. He was selected as High Sheriff of Yorkshire for 1874–75.

== Family ==
He married firstly Delia, daughter of John Wilmer Field, in 1836. Their eldest son, Charles Wilmer Duncombe, was a Major-General in the Army; their second son Arthur Duncombe was also a politician; while their fourth and youngest son George Augustus Duncombe was created a baronet in 1919 (see Duncombe baronets). After Delia's death in 1873 he married secondly Jane Maria, daughter of Sir James Walker, 1st Baronet. Duncombe's second wife died in August 1917. He himself died in February 1889, aged 82.

== See also ==
- O'Byrne, William Richard (1849). "Duncombe, Arthur" . A Naval Biographical Dictionary . John Murray – via Wikisource.

Military offices
Preceded by Sir Alexander Milne, Bt	Fourth Naval Lord; 1852–1853	Succeeded by Sir Alexander Milne, Bt
Parliament of the United Kingdom
Preceded by Sir Robert Dundas; William Battie-Wrightson	Member of Parliament for East Retford; 1830–1831; With: Viscount Newark	Succeeded by Granville Vernon; Viscount Newark
Preceded by Granville Harcourt-Vernon; Viscount Newark	Member of Parliament for East Retford; 1835–1851; With: Granville Harcourt-Vernon 1835–1847; The Viscount Galway 1847–1852	Succeeded by William Duncombe; The Viscount Galway
Preceded by Henry Broadley; The Lord Hotham	Member of Parliament for Yorkshire East Riding; 1851–1868; With: The Lord Hotham	Succeeded by William Harrison-Broadley; Christopher Sykes
Court offices
Preceded by ?	Groom in Waiting in Ordinary; 1841–1846	Succeeded by Sir Edward Bowater
Political offices
Preceded by William Cowper-Temple	Civil Lord of the Admiralty; 1852	Succeeded by William Cowper-Temple
