= Highfield Cocoa and Coffee House =

Building in Sheffield, England

Coordinates: 53.3700°N 1.4777°W

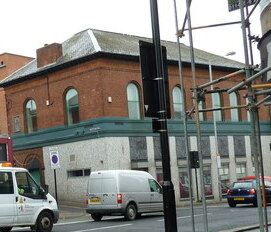
East (front) and south elevations pictured in 2012

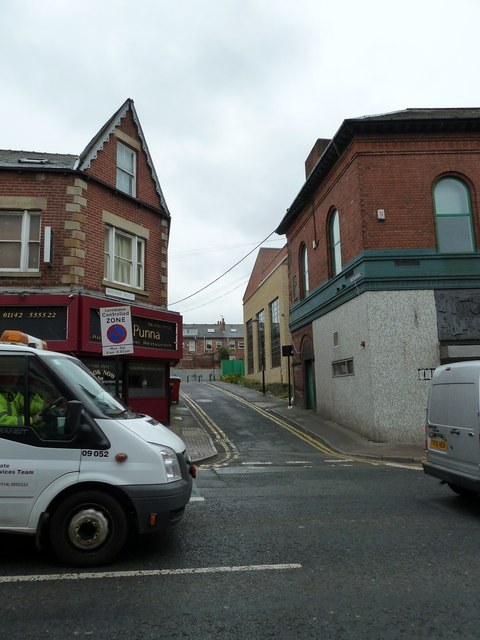
Showing south side and adjacent road (Keeton's Hill), London Road in the foreground

The Highfield Cocoa and Coffee House is a building in Sheffield, England. It was built in 1877 by Frederick Thorpe Mappin, a local businessman, and was intended to provide non-alcoholic entertainment to the working classes. It featured a coffee, tea and cocoa bar, a library, billiards room and skittle alley. The Cocoa and Coffee House closed in 1908 and the building was used to house a confectioner's shop. In the 1950s the structure was acquired by the shopfitters George Barlow & Sons and used as a showroom. The firm installed seven Modernist concrete friezes to the façade in 1967. The firm, which had since become Keetons Property, sought to demolish the building in 2022 to construct a block of flats. The demolition was objected to by Hallamshire Historic Buildings (HHB) and the Victorian Society.

== Construction and operation ==
The Highfield Cocoa and Coffee House is located at 136 London Road, Sheffield. It was built in 1877 by Frederick Thorpe Mappin, a businessman with the family firms Mappin Brothers and Mappin & Webb, who later became a member of parliament. Mappin intended the building to provide entertainment to the working classes, in a similar manner to that provided by gentlemen's clubs to the upper classes. Although Mappin was not a teetotaller he established the Cocoa and Coffee House as a non-alcoholic venue, as an alternative to public houses. The building was the first of its type in the city, following experiments with similar establishments in Liverpool and London as part of the temperance movement. Mappin had no previous involvement with the movement and seems to have built the Cocoa and Coffee House at the suggestion of a Reverend Lamb of St Mary's Church, Bramall Lane, who had read of the Liverpool experiment.

The building was designed by M. E. Hadfield & Son and cost £4,500 to construct. The ground floor was laid out as a single large room with tables for the consumption of beverages. The upper floor, reached by a wide staircase, contained a reading room, library and billiards room. A steward's house sat to the rear and, between the two structures and covered by a glass roof, was a skittle alley. The exterior features arch windows and terracotta detailing.

The building was sited to attract workers from the nearby Portland Works and Stag Works. The building was open from 5 am to 11 pm, catering for the breakfast and lunchtime trade as well as evening entertainment. Cocoa, coffee and tea were sold at a penny a pint and bread and butter was also available (though patrons could also bring in their own food). The billiards tables, chess sets and card decks could be hired though gambling was strictly prohibited. The Cocoa and Coffee House was run on a commercial basis, with profits being returned to Mappin. It was initially very popular, reporting 500 customers attending for breakfast and 600 for teatime in 1879. Cocoa houses quickly lost market share to the newly popular cafés and Highfield Cocoa and Coffee House closed in 1908.

== Later uses ==
After closure the Cocoa and Coffee House became a Hibbert's confectioner's shop. The shopfitters George Barlow & Sons were based nearby and took over the building for use as a showroom in the 1950s. In 1967 the firm installed a series of seven Modernist friezes on the façade. The artist is not known but they appear to be rendered in Faircrete, a concrete-based material used extensively by William Mitchell and associated sculptors. The friezes are identical and appear to be of an industrial theme. Details include a rosette taken from the building's 19th-century terracotta tiles and also possibly cocoa pods or steel crucibles, a band saw and clinker. The building is noted in the 2004 Pevsner city guide for Sheffield as being "large, two storeys in brick, quite plain with round-headed windows".

== Proposed demolition ==
George Barlow & Sons became Keetons Property in 2003. In 2022 Keetons proposed to demolish the structure and construct a 5-storey block of 22 flats with ground-floor retail units. The developer stated that the building's "age, suitability, poor condition, limited capacity for adaptation and overall unsustainable characteristics" precluded renovation and that it contained asbestos and was prone to flooding. The proposed development included the site of the Tramway pub, demolished in 2015, and a vacant office building to the rear of the coffee house, where a further 27 flats would be built.

There were 37 objections by individuals to the proposals in addition to objections by the organisations Hallamshire Historic Buildings (HHB) and the Victorian Society. HHB stated that the new development would be "a jarring intrusion into an historic streetscape in an aggressively unsympathetic style using inappropriately coloured materials, on an overbearing scale in both overall mass and decoration". HHB further state that the Cocoa and Coffee House is "an already attractive building has benefited from a sensitive and thoughtful later addition" and have applied to have the Cocoa and Coffee House locally listed to prevent its demolition. The Victorian Society state that the existing structure is "a distinguished building, adopting a dignified Italianate form with handsome and high-quality brickwork detailing".
