= Cats in New Zealand =

Cats are a popular pet in New Zealand. Cat ownership is occasionally raised as a controversial conservation issue due to the predation of endangered species, such as birds and lizards, by feral cats.

== Population of cats ==
The domestic cat (Felis catus) first arrived at New Zealand on Captain James Cook's ship HMS Endeavour in the mid-18th century, but were established by European settlers a century later.

=== Domestic cats ===
Companion animals are popular in New Zealand, with 60% of households having either a cat or a dog. In 2020, Companion Animals New Zealand reported that there are around 1.2 million domestic cats in New Zealand, with around 41% of households having at least one cat. Trends in cat ownership are:

Parameter	2011	2015	2020
Household penetration	48%	44%	41%
Average no. in home	1.8	1.5	1.7
Total numbers (million)	1.419	1.134	1.219

=== Stray and feral cats ===
The estimated populations of stray and feral cats are 200,000 and 2.4 million respectively.

== Legislation, code of practice and bylaws ==
There are extensive sections of the Animal Welfare Act 1999 that apply to cats and their owners, but as of 2023, New Zealand does not have legislation that is specific to the management of cats. However, a Code of Welfare: Companion Cats was issued in 2018 under the Animal Welfare Act to expand on the requirements of the Act. The code sets minimum standards and recommends best practice for the care and management of cats. The minimum standards in the code can be used to support a prosecution for offences under the Act.

For biosecurity reasons cats must undergo tests and treatment before being imported into New Zealand and in some cases direct importation is not permitted. The Animal Welfare Act deems it to be illegal to abandon an unwanted cat.

In addition to the Act and the national Code of Welfare, many (but not all) local councils have bylaws pertaining to cats. In 2020, the Selwyn District Council removed requirements for micro-chipping of cats from a planned new animal control bylaw, because the absence of national legislation meant that the council lacked the ability to issue fines or to obtain revenue from compulsory registration that might fund enforcement action.

== National Cat Management Strategy Group ==
In 2014 a National Cat Management Strategy Group (NCMSG) was formed, with representation from the New Zealand Veterinarians Association, the Royal New Zealand Society for the Prevention of Cruelty to Animals (SPCA), the New Zealand Companion Animal Council, the Morgan Foundation and Local Government New Zealand, with technical advisors from Department of Conservation and observers from the Ministry for Primary Industries. The NCMSG published a report in 2020 with 13 recommendations, including the enactment of a National Cat Management Act that would enable nationally consistent approaches to humane management of cats and enforcement of bylaws.

The NCMSG report recommended categorisations for use in frameworks for improving the management of cats:

- Feral cats
- Domestic cats
  - Companion (owned) cats
  - Stray cats;
    - Socialised stray cats (managed and unmanaged)
    - Unsocialised stray cats (managed and unmanaged)

== Feral cats ==
Cat eradication on outlying islands
Island	Date completed	Notes
Cuvier Island	1964	
Herekopare	1970	
Kapiti Island	1934	Now a nature reserve
Little Barrier Island	1980	Now a nature reserve
Motuihe	1978–1979	
Stephens Island	1925	Cats caused the extinction of an endemic bird
Tiritiri Matangi Island	1970s	Now an open sanctuary

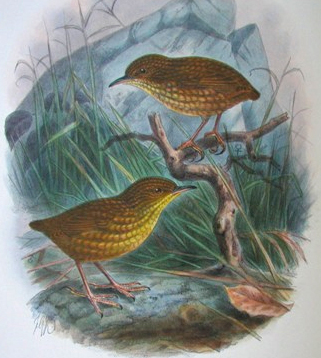
Lyall's wren became extinct within two years of the introduction of cats to Stephens Island. (an illustration from Walter Lawry Buller's A History of the Birds of New Zealand, published in 1905)

Apart from two species of bats, New Zealand did not have any land-based mammals until settlement by the Māori and by European people. As a consequence, birds and even insects took over the ecological niche normally filled by mammals. The introduced mammals, including cats, became invasive species that severely affected the native wildlife.

It is estimated that feral cats have been responsible for the extinction of six endemic bird species and over 70 localised subspecies, as well as depleting the populations of bird and lizard species. The extinction of Lyall's wren is a case of bird extinction due to predation by cats. The extinction of the birds is often blamed on the lighthouse keeper's cat alone, but cats had become established in 1894 when a single pregnant female landed on the island, so it is likely that it was a result of the whole cat population.

Cats are problematic on other islands as well. It was speculated that cats would have caused the extinction of the kākāpō on Stewart Island / Rakiura, had the birds not been moved to other islands. The introduction of cats on to Mangere, Herekopare and Raoul Islands caused localised extinctions of bird species. After cats were eradicated from Little Barrier Island, the local bird populations increased and North Island saddlebacks were successfully reintroduced.

Feral cats are the principal threat to the critically endangered black stilt and as of February 2010 only 85 birds remain, largely in the Mackenzie Basin. After the illegal introduction of rabbit haemorrhagic disease (RCD) into New Zealand, rabbit numbers were reduced dramatically for a period of time. When the rabbit numbers in the Mackenzie Basin were low, feral cats switched from preying on rabbits to preying on native fauna, including the black stilt. A trapping programme for cats and other predators that threatened the black stilt population was instigated by the Department of Conservation.

The impact of feral cats on species other than birds is not as well documented although in 2010 the Department of Conservation discovered that a feral cat was responsible for killing over 100 endangered New Zealand short-tailed bats over a seven-day period in a forested area on the southern slope of Mount Ruapehu.

In 2020 the Hamilton City Council opened a $100,000 fund to desex and home feral cats in the city.

In November 2025, the Conservation Minister Tama Potaka confirmed that feral cats would be added to Predator Free 2050's official list of exotic species to be targeted for eradication.

== Predation by domestic cats ==
Because of the effects of predation on New Zealand wildlife, domestic cat ownership is sometimes a contentious issue. Since the 1990s, cat-free subdivisions have occasionally been established to prevent predation occurring within nearby natural areas by domestic cats. In 1996 a cat-free subdivision was established at Waihi Beach, a landmark decision by the Western Bay of Plenty District Council. It was sought by Forest and Bird and the Department of Conservation to protect wildlife in a nearby salt marsh.

In 2012, the operators of the Zealandia wildlife sanctuary called for cat owners not to replace their pet when they die as a means of reducing the cat population. In 2013, Gareth Morgan, an economist and philanthropist, caused an international furore when he called for cats to be wiped out. He launched the "Cats To Go" website to support the stance. It is suggested that owners could euthanize their cats, but it is not seen as necessary. Some conservationists supported the stance taken by Morgan.

Even though cats control rodents which also prey on native wildlife and thus have a protective role, the precautionary principle is recommended in certain cases such as adjacent to natural areas and in outer suburbs of cities.

== Toxoplasmosis ==
Toxoplasmosis is a disease caused by an infection of Toxoplasma gondii, a protozoan parasite found worldwide that can infect virtually all warm-blooded animals. Felids such as domestic and feral cats are the only known definitive hosts in which the parasite may undergo sexual reproduction. Animals and humans can become infected through contact with food, water or materials in the environment that are contaminated with faeces from an infected cat. A study done on patients in Auckland with acute toxoplasmosis revealed that the disease may be seriously debilitating in some cases. The patients had a high rate of fatigue, headaches, and had a difficulty with concentration.

New Zealand native animals can be at risk from toxoplasmosis. Several species of kiwi from wild populations have been found to be infected, with consequences that may lead to the death of the bird. Research is being undertaken to establish the extent to which kiwi are exposed to T. gondii.

Toxoplasmosis has been confirmed as a cause of death of endangered Hector's dolphin's and critically endangered Māui dolphins. The T. gondii parasite is only known to reproduce in cats. The eggs of the parasite spread from cat faeces into the environment, and travel via stormwater and wastewater to the sea. Dolphins can become infected when parasites from cat faeces end up in the marine food chain.

== Organisations ==
There are numerous cat welfare and cat breeding organisations in New Zealand. The Royal New Zealand Society for the Prevention of Cruelty to Animals was formed in 1882 and now has 47 branches around the country. Cats Unloved is a Christchurch-based organisation working with cats. In 2011 the organisation was criticised for euthanasing cats with chloroform, although it is done legally and is considered to be necessary to address the problem of stray cats, seen as a large problem in the city. The animal euthanasia is done on wild and diseased cats and those which were not housetrained. There are also a number of Cats Protection League groups in different parts of the country.

New Zealand Cat Fancy is a governing body for the many cat clubs around the country and CATZ Inc is a registry for New Zealand cats.

== Cats in popular culture ==
"Horse" is a cat in the popular cartoon series Footrot Flats. It is a large, fierce and practically invincible cat, based on one that belonged to Murray Ball, the creator of the cartoon series.

Mittens, a Turkish Angora resident of Wellington, became a minor internet celebrity with a strong following on Facebook. People from all of the world tried to glimpse him when they visited the Capital as he wandered kilometres away from his home in Kelburn. Mittens moved to Auckland in late 2021.

== Phantom big cat sightings ==
Since the late 1990s, big cat sightings (phantom cats) have been reported in widely separated parts of New Zealand, in both the North and South Islands. There have been several unverified panther sightings in Mid-Canterbury near Ashburton and in the nearby foothills of the Southern Alps, but searches conducted there in 2003 by the Ministry of Agriculture and Forestry found no corroborating physical evidence.

== See also ==
- Mammals of New Zealand
- Conservation in New Zealand
- Invasive species in New Zealand
- Trap–neuter–return
