= Charles Pierrepont, Viscount Newark =

British politician and poet

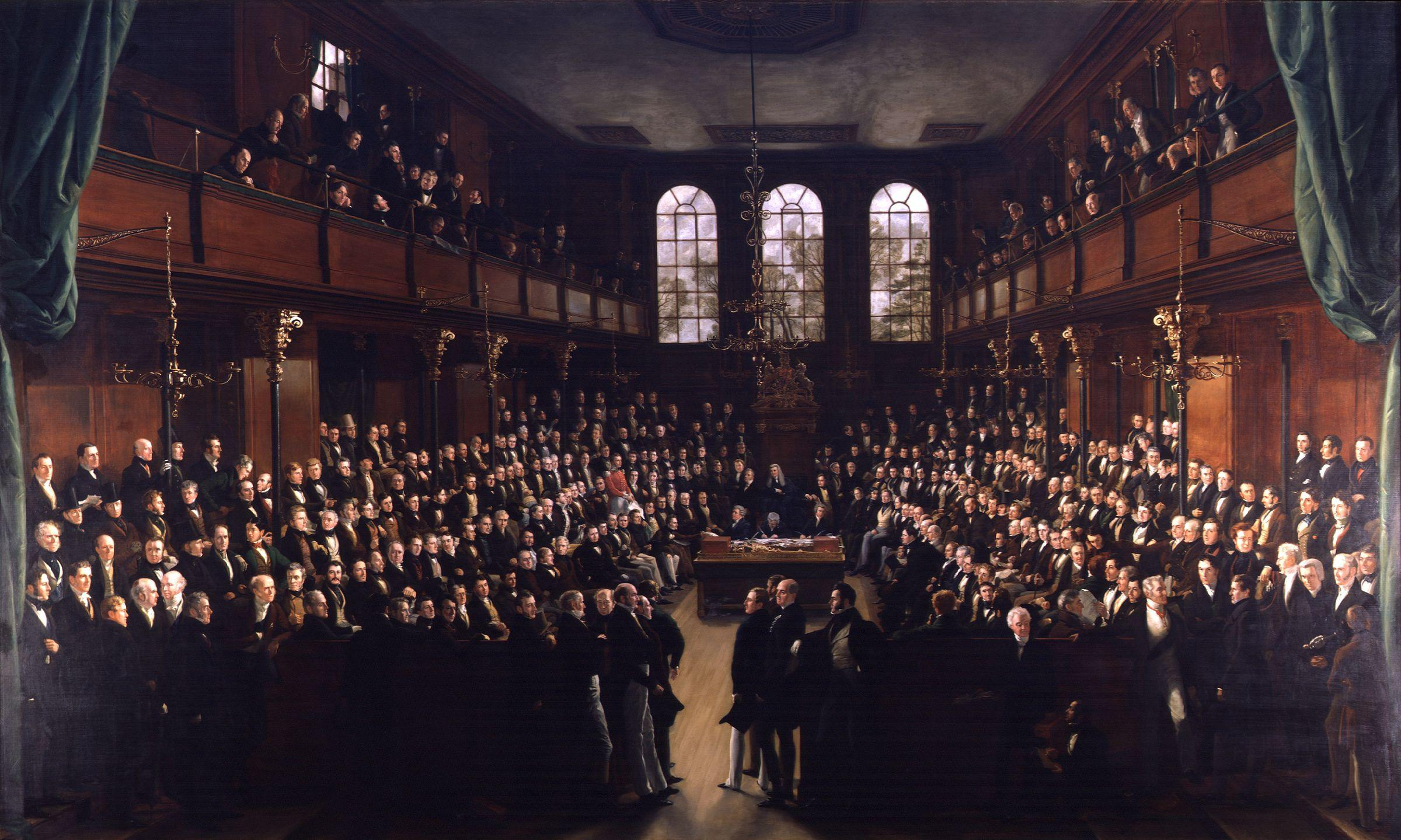
The House of Commons, 1833, by Sir George Hayter (died 1871), given to the National Portrait Gallery, London in 1858. Also known as "The Meeting of the First Reformed Parliament". See source website for additional information.

Charles Evelyn Pierrepont, Viscount Newark MP (2 September 1805 – 23 August 1850) was a Member of Parliament for East Retford, and poet.

== Family ==
He was born on 2 September 1805 at Holme Pierrepont Hall, the son of Charles Pierrepont, 2nd Earl Manvers, and Mary Letitia Eyre. On the ascent of his father to Earl Manvers in 1816 he was styled as Viscount Newark until his death in 1850. He was married on 16 August 1832 to Hon. Emily Littleton, daughter of Edward Littleton, 1st Baron Hatherton and Hyacinthe Mary Wellesley. He died aged 44 on 23 August 1850 in Torquay, Devon.

== Career ==
He was educated at Christ Church, Oxford and matriculated on 21 October 1823. He was awarded BA in 1826.

He was a Whig Member of Parliament for East Retford from 1830 to 1835.

Shortly before his death in 1850 he published a set of verses written between 1840 and 1848.

Parliament of the United Kingdom
Preceded by Sir Robert Dundas; William Battie-Wrightson	Member of Parliament for East Retford; 1830–1831; With: Arthur Duncombe	Succeeded by Granville Harcourt-Vernon; The Viscount Newark
Preceded by Arthur Duncombe; The Viscount Newark	Member of Parliament for East Retford; 1831–1835; With: Granville Harcourt-Vernon	Succeeded by Arthur Duncombe; Granville Harcourt-Vernon
