= William Beckett-Denison =

English banker and politician

Member of Parliament for Bassetlaw
- In office 1885–1890
- Preceded by: New constituency
- Succeeded by: Frederick Milner

Member of Parliament for East Retford
- In office 1876–1880
- Preceded by: The Viscount Galway; Francis Foljambe
- Succeeded by: Frederick Mappin; Francis Foljambe

Personal details
- Born: William Beckett; 10 September 1826
- Died: 23 November 1890 (aged 64) Wimborne, East Dorset, England
- Party: Conservative
- Spouse: Hon. Helen Duncombe (m. 1855)
- Relations: William Duncombe, 2nd Baron Feversham (father-in-law)
- Parents: Sir Edmund Beckett, 4th Baronet (father); Maria Beverley (mother)
- Education: Rugby School
- Alma mater: Trinity College, Cambridge
- Occupation: Banker, politician

William Beckett-Denison (10 September 1826 – 23 November 1890) was an English banker and Conservative Party politician who sat in the House of Commons in two periods between 1876 and 1890. He died when he fell under a train at Wimborne.

== Early life ==
Born William Beckett on 10 September 1826, he was the third and second surviving son of Sir Edmund Beckett, 4th Baronet, of Grimthorpe, Yorkshire, and his wife Maria Beverley, daughter of William Beverley of Beverley.

He was educated at Rugby School and Trinity College, Cambridge.

== Career ==
In 1847, at age 21, he joined his father's banking firm, Beckett & Co. He later became a partner and, in 1874, was made head of the firm at Leeds, Doncaster, and Retford. Upon the retirement of Leslie Melville, he became head of the English County Bankers' Association as well as the East Riding Bank at Beverley and Malton. He was a captain in the Yorkshire Hussar Yeomanry Cavalry and a J.P. and Deputy Lieutenant for the West Riding of Yorkshire.

In 1865, Beckett became the first chairman of the publishing company, Yorkshire Post Newspapers. Successive chairmen were members of the Beckett family until the retirement of Rupert Beckett in 1950.

In 1876, Beckett was elected a Conservative Member of Parliament for East Retford but lost the seat in 1880. At the 1885 general election, he was elected MP for Bassetlaw. He held the seat until his death in 1890.

== Personal life ==
Beckett married the Hon. Helen Duncombe, third daughter of William Duncombe, 2nd Baron Feversham and Lady Louisa Stewart (daughter of George Stewart, 8th Earl of Galloway), in 1855. They lived at Meanwood Park in Leeds and at Nun Appleton, Yorkshire, and were the parents of at least seven children, including:

- Ernest William Beckett (1856–1917), who became the 2nd Baron Grimthorpe.
- Helen Louisa Beckett-Denison (1858–1935).
- Adeline Gertrude Beckett-Denison (1859–1902), who married Sir Frederick Milner, 7th Baronet.
- Violet Katharine Beckett-Denison (1860–1883), who married Reginald Walkeline Chandos-Pole, grandson of Leicester Stanhope, 5th Earl of Harrington.
- Maud Augusta Beckett-Denison (1864–1927), who married Lord Henry Nevill (later 3rd Marquess of Abergavenny).
- William Gervase Beckett (1866–1937), who became Sir Gervase Beckett, 1st Baronet of Kirkdale Manor.
- Hon. Rupert Evelyn Beckett (1870–1955), who married Muriel Helen Florence Paget, granddaughter of Henry Paget, 2nd Marquess of Anglesey.

Beckett died at the age of 64 when he fell under a train at Wimborne. He had arrived at Wimborne railway station to change trains for Bournemouth, and while waiting, he went for a walk. He was walking beside the track on the way back to the station when a strong wind blew his hat off, and he fell almost immediately under the train. His body was cut to pieces and carried some 56 feet.

Following his death, Mrs. Gertrude Beatrice Brinkworth alleged she was his mistress and mother of his adopted children and sued his executors. Some money was paid, but the case came before the court, and the jury declared Mrs. Brinkworth's case to be a 'swindle' and rejected her claims even before the evidence in the case had been completed.

Parliament of the United Kingdom
Preceded by The Viscount Galway; Francis Foljambe	Member of Parliament for East Retford; 1876–1880; With: Francis Foljambe	Succeeded by Frederick Mappin; Francis Foljambe
New constituency	Member of Parliament for Bassetlaw; 1885–1890	Succeeded by Frederick Milner
