= Thornbury Hospital =

- Circle Health Group
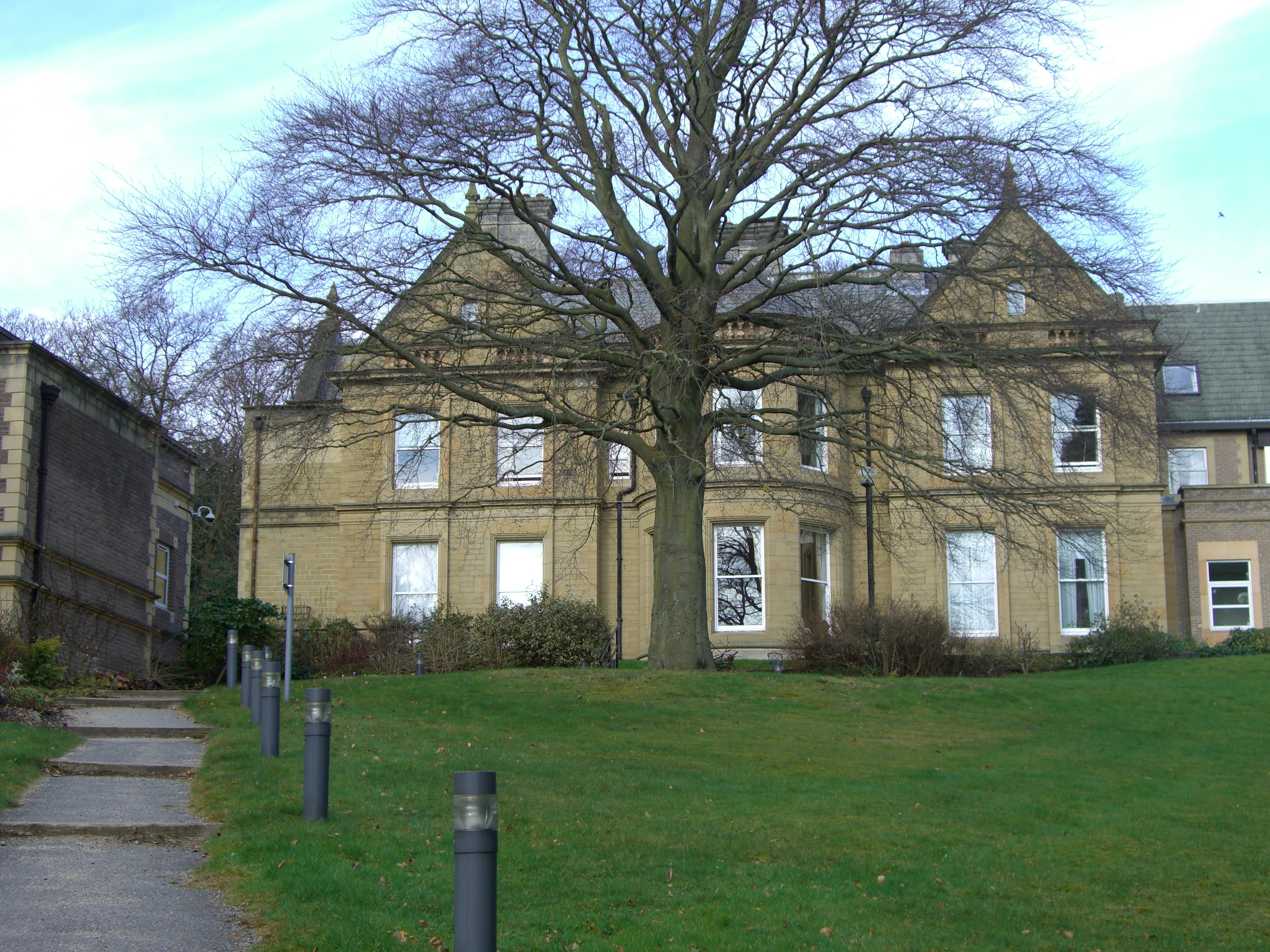
- Thornbury Hospital

- Shown in South Yorkshire

Geography
- Location: Sheffield, South Yorkshire, England
- Coordinates: 53.374324°N 1.517411°W

Organisation
- Care system: Private
- Type: General

Services
- Emergency department: No

History
- Founded: 1947

Links
- Lists: Hospitals in England

Thornbury Hospital is a private hospital situated on Fulwood Road in the Ranmoor area of the City of Sheffield, England. The hospital is owned by BMI Healthcare. The building was previously a private residence constructed in 1865.

== History ==
Thornbury was built between 1864 and 1865, when Frederick Mappin, the cutlery and steel magnate, commissioned the architects M.E. Hadfield and Son to design a new house for him. Mappin had previously been Master Cutler in 1855 and would go on to become Mayor of Sheffield in 1877/8 and a Liberal MP in 1880. Thornbury is a big bold stone house with curving two storey bay windows. It is in the Classical style with two wings, balustraded parapet and a steep pitched roof with tall chimneys and gables. The main entrance is at the western side of the building and this has a two storey porch and a large oriel window. The house which sits on six acres of land looks over mature gardens which were designed by Robert Marnock. The entrance is reached by a long sweeping drive off Fulwood Road; a small lodge is situated at the entrance to the drive.

During the Second World War the house was used for storage by The Admiralty. In 1947 it was purchased by the newly formed National Health Service for £11,500 and used as an annexe for the Sheffield Children's Hospital. It opened in 1951 as a 50-bed unit and was known as Thornbury Annexe until 1976 when it was renamed as the Children’s Hospital, Thornbury. It served as a medical annexe, isolation ward and convalescent home for the children. In 1982 it was sold by the trustees of the former United Sheffield Hospitals for development as a private hospital, however the annexe stood vacant for a number of years but the Sheffield Child Development Study research unit remained in the grounds of the disused annexe. In July 1990 the unit moved to new premises in the Stephenson Unit at Sheffield Children's Hospital. Thornbury was enlarged and restored in the early 1990s and opened as a private hospital under the management of BMI Healthcare.

== Services ==
The hospital now has in-patient facilities with four operating theatres, an endoscopy suite, a high dependency unit and an intensive care unit. The hospital offers treatment from routine investigations to complex surgery.

== See also ==
- List of hospitals in England
