= Granville Harcourt-Vernon (1792–1879) =

British politician

The Right Honourable Granville Harcourt-Vernon

Member of Parliament for East Retford
- In office 1832–1847 Serving with Viscount Newark, Hon. Arthur Duncombe
- Preceded by: Viscount Newark; Hon. Arthur Duncombe
- Succeeded by: Hon. Arthur Duncombe; The Viscount Galway

Member of Parliament for Aldborough
- In office 1815–1820 Serving with Henry Fynes
- Preceded by: Henry Fynes; Henry Gally-Knight
- Succeeded by: Henry Fynes; Gibbs Antrobus

Personal details
- Born: 26 July 1792
- Died: 8 December 1879 (aged 87)
- Spouse(s): Frances Julia Eyre (m. 1814; died 1844) Hon. Pyne Jesse Cotterell (m. 1845; died 1872)
- Relations: William Vernon Harcourt (brother); Francis Venables-Vernon-Harcourt (brother); Octavius Vernon Harcourt (brother); Granville Leveson-Gower, 1st Marquess of Stafford (grandfather); George Venables-Vernon, 1st Baron Vernon (grandfather)
- Parent(s): Edward Venables-Vernon-Harcourt; Lady Anne Leveson-Gower

Granville Harcourt-Vernon (26 July 1792 – 8 December 1879), was a British politician.

== Early life ==
Harcourt-Vernon was born on 26 July 1792. He was the sixth son of the Most Reverend Edward Venables-Vernon-Harcourt, Archbishop of York and Lady Anne Leveson-Gower. Among his siblings were scientist William Vernon Harcourt, Francis Venables-Vernon-Harcourt and Octavius Vernon Harcourt.

His father was the third son of George Venables-Vernon, 1st Baron Vernon, and his mother was the daughter of Granville Leveson-Gower, 1st Marquess of Stafford.

== Career ==
Harcourt-Vernon was Member of Parliament for Aldborough between 1815 and 1820 and for East Retford between 1832 and 1847.

== Personal life ==
Harcourt-Vernon was twice married. In 1814, he married Frances Julia Eyre (d. 1844), daughter of Anthony Hardolph Eyre and the former Francisca Alicia Bootle (third daughter of Richard Wilbraham-Bootle). They had several children, including:

- Granville Edward Harcourt-Vernon (1816–1861), MP for Newark who married Lady Selina Catherine Meade, daughter of Richard Meade, 3rd Earl of Clanwilliam, in 1854.
- Evelyn Hardolph Harcourt-Vernon (1821–1890), the Prebendary of Lincoln and Rural Dean of Bingham who married Jane Catherine St John-Mildmay, a daughter of Edward St John-Mildmay, in 1849.
- Henry Arthur Harcourt-Vernon (1835–1862), a Major.
- Charles Egerton Harcourt-Vernon (1827–1872), Captain in the Royal Navy, who married Louisa Anne Garth in 1865.
- Marianne Harcourt-Vernon (1823–1873), who married Humphrey St John-Mildmay, MP for Southampton, in 1843.

After her death in February 1844 he married secondly the Hon. Pyne Jesse Trevor, daughter of Henry Trevor, 21st Baron Dacre and widow of John Henry Cotterell, in 1845. There were no children from this marriage.

She died in March 1872. Harcourt-Vernon survived her by seven years and died in December 1879, aged 87.

Parliament of the United Kingdom
Preceded by Henry Fynes; Henry Gally-Knight	Member of Parliament for Aldborough; 1815–1820; With: Henry Fynes	Succeeded by Henry Fynes; Gibbs Antrobus
Preceded by Viscount Newark; Hon. Arthur Duncombe	Member of Parliament for East Retford; 1832–1847; With: Viscount Newark 1831–1835; Hon. Arthur Duncombe 1835–1847	Succeeded by Hon. Arthur Duncombe; The Viscount Galway
Honorary titles
Preceded by Robert Holden	High Sheriff of Nottinghamshire; 1849	Succeeded by Edward Strutt
