= Frank Mappin =

New Zealand politician and orchardist (1884–1975)

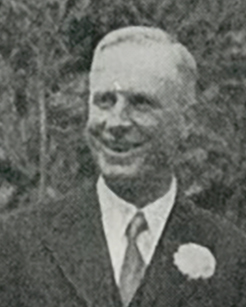
Mappin in 1941

Sir Frank Crossley Mappin, 6th Baronet (15 August 1884 – 25 January 1975) was a New Zealand orchardist, horticulturist and philanthropist. He was born in Scampton, Lincolnshire, England on 15 August 1884.

In 1953, Mappin was awarded the Queen Elizabeth II Coronation Medal. He and his wife donated their Auckland home, which they had called Birchlands, to the New Zealand government to be used as Government House.

Businessman Sir Rob Fenwick was his grandson.

== Arms ==
Coat of arms of Frank Mappin

Crest
A boar Sable charged with a pale Or and resting the dexter fore-foot upon a spur fesswise also Or.
Escutcheon
Azure on a bend engrailed between two boars' heads erased Argent three lozenges of the field.
Motto
Cor Forte Calcar Non Requirit

Baronetage of the United Kingdom
Preceded by Samuel Mappin	Baronet (of Thornbury); 1942–1975	Extinct
