= Predator Free 2050 =

Governmental plan for eradicating pests in New Zealand

Predator Free 2050 is a plan put forth by the New Zealand government with the goal of eradicating possums, rats, stoats, and feral cats, all introduced predators, by 2050.

== Goals and scope ==
Aside from the stated goal of eradicating all predator species by 2050, the Department of Conservation has outlined four interim 2025 goals:

- Suppress predators on a further 1 million hectares (3,900 mi^{2}).
- Eradicate predators from at least 20,000 hectares without the use of fences.
- Eradicate predators from island nature reserves.
- Achieve a breakthrough science solution capable of eradicating at least one small mammal predator.

Prime Minister John Key said in mid-2016 that current technologies and methods would be insufficient for the ultimate goal of the project, and the Government was banking on a 'major scientific breakthrough' to allow for the eradication of possums, stoats, and rats.

=== Community support ===
The Predator Free 2050 goal is built on a foundation of strong community conservation efforts with over 2,000 community groups across New Zealand taking part in predator control efforts. Those community efforts are supported by the Predator Free New Zealand Trust, a charity founded in 2013 with express purpose of advocating for community conservation in New Zealand.

PF2050 Ltd called for expressions of interest from parties that are capable and committed to achieving the Government’s ambitious goal to rid New Zealand of possums, rats and stoats by 2050. PF2050 wishes to identify regional/local councils, communities, mana whenua, businesses, NGOs and/or other entities who have predator eradication initiatives either underway or contemplated that can contribute toward meeting its interim (2025) goals identified above. A selection of projects will enter a request-for-proposal stage with the aim of approving the first projects for PF2050 investment by mid-February 2018.

== History ==
=== Launch ===
Under the Predator Free 2050 plan, the government invested NZ$28 million into a joint venture company, Predator Free 2050 Ltd, with a plan for an additional $1 added for each $2 invested by the public, third parties such as philanthropic foundations or local councils. It was later reported that they had also pledged an additional $7 million per year after the initial $28 million was provided over the first four years.

On 25 July 2017, Conservation Minister Maggie Barry spoke about the project, calling it "the most important conservation project in the history of our country" and also said that Predator Free 2050 Ltd was planning to announce the first major project it would be funding before the end of 2017.

=== Research strategy ===
In November 2017, Predator Free 2050 Ltd announced their research strategy. In contrast to previous speculative commentary, this is the officially approved approach being taken. The strategy outlines four concurrent programmes:

- "Environment and society" will explore New Zealand's social and cultural views about predator eradication.
- Eradicating the last 1%' focuses on upgrading current predator control approaches.
- "New genetic control tools" aims to inform New Zealanders as to the benefits and risks of new genetic technologies prior to any commitment to develop such tools for Predator Free 2050.
- "Computer modelling" will develop shared resources that all communities and agencies contributing to Predator Free 2050 can use to design the right approach for their goals and environment.

=== 2025 review and restructuring ===
In May 2025, the Department of Conservation released a discussion document outlining proposals to update the Predator Free 2050 strategy. It includes revised goals to be achieved by 2030 and considers adding feral cats to the list of nationally targeted predator species. It proposes the creation of a biodiversity investment prospectus to attract external funding from businesses, philanthropists, NGOs, and iwi. This would identify investment-ready conservation projects that deliver biodiversity gains alongside climate and flood resilience benefits. It also includes a proposed review of fee schedules and access rules for commercial and recreational use of public conservation land and waters, with the goal of ensuring fair contribution to conservation outcomes.

In May 2025 the Government announced that Predator Free 2050 Ltd would be disestablished, with management of the project being handed to the Department of Conservation.

In November 2025, the Conservation Minister Tama Potaka confirmed that feral cats would be added to Predator Free 2050's target list of exotic species. Feral cats had previously been excluded from the programme due to opposition from cat owners.
