= George Monckton-Arundell, 6th Viscount Galway =

The Right Honourable The Viscount Galway
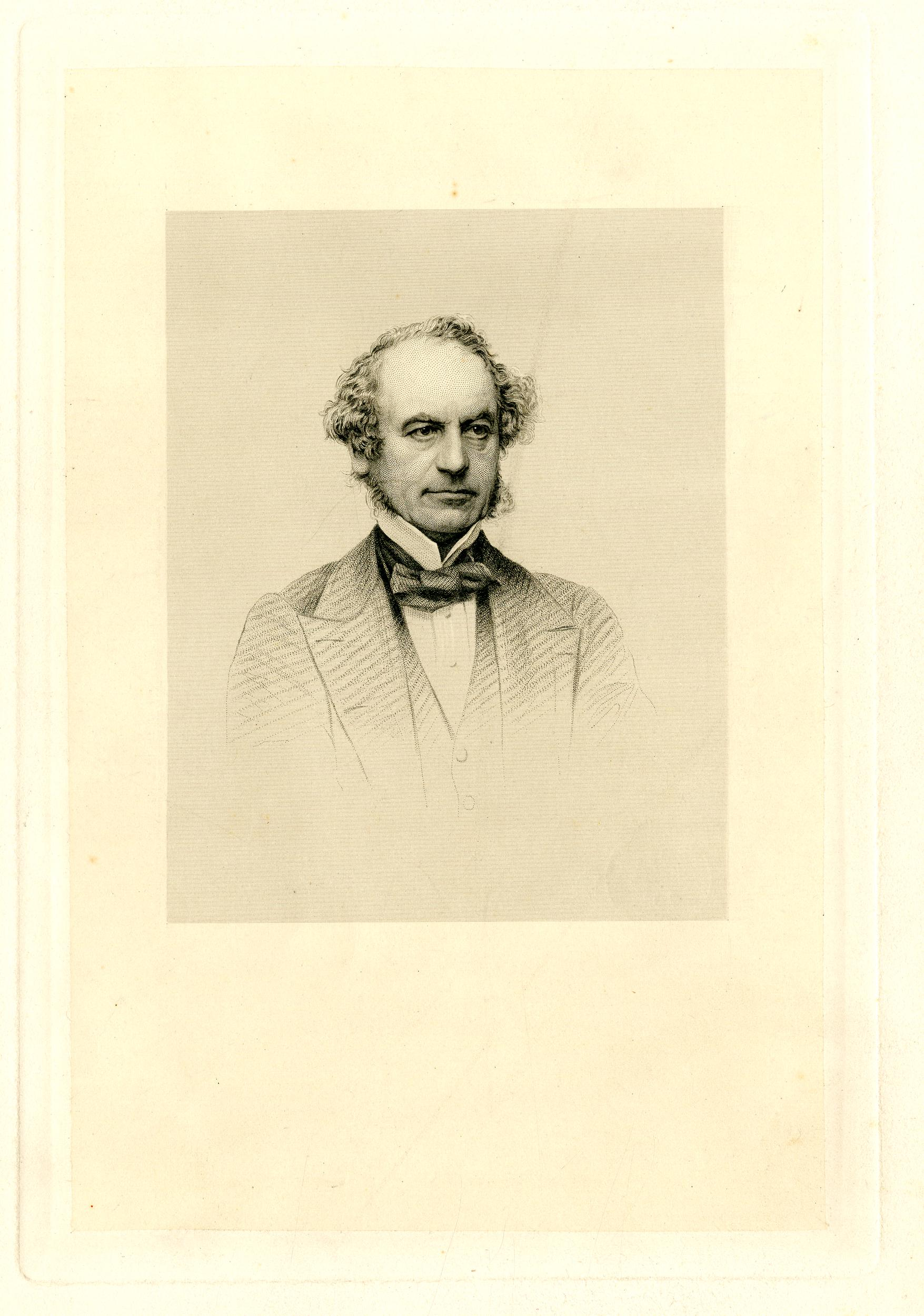
- Engraving of Lord Galway by Joseph Brown, 1870

Member of Parliament for East Retford
- In office 1847–1876 Serving with Arthur Duncombe, William Duncombe, Francis Foljambe
- Preceded by: Granville Harcourt Vernon; Arthur Duncombe
- Succeeded by: Francis Foljambe; William Beckett-Denison

Personal details
- Born: George Edward Arundell Monckton-Arundell; 1 March 1805
- Died: 6 February 1876 (aged 70) Serlby Hall, Essex
- Spouse: Henrietta Milnes (m. 1838; died 1876)
- Relations: George Monckton-Arundell, 8th Viscount Galway (grandson)
- Children: George Monckton-Arundell, 7th Viscount Galway
- Parent(s): William Monckton-Arundell, 5th Viscount Galway; Catherine Elizabeth Handfield
- Education: Harrow School
- Alma mater: Christ Church, Oxford

George Edward Arundell Monckton-Arundell, 6th Viscount Galway (1 March 1805 – 6 February 1876), was a British Conservative politician.

== Early life ==
George Edward Arundell Monckton-Arundell was born on 1 March 1805. He was the son of William George Monckton-Arundell, 5th Viscount Galway and Catherine Elizabeth Handfield.

He was educated at Harrow and matriculated at Christ Church, Oxford, in 1824, earning his B.A. in 1827.

== Career ==
He succeeded his father in the viscountcy in 1834 but as this was an Irish peerage it did not entitle him to an automatic seat in the House of Lords.

He was instead elected to the House of Commons for East Retford in 1847, a seat he held until 1876 (the remainder of his life), and served as a Lord-in-waiting in 1852 in the first Conservative administration of the Earl of Derby.

== Personal life ==
On 25 April 1838 Lord Galway married his first cousin Henrietta Maria Milnes at St George's, Hanover Square. She was a daughter of Robert Pemberton and sister of Richard Monckton Milnes, 1st Baron Houghton, in 1838. Together, they were the parents of:

- George Edward Milnes Monckton-Arundell, 7th Viscount Galway (1844–1931), who married Vere Gosling, the only daughter of Ellis Gosling of Busbridge Hall, Surrey in 1879.

He was Master of the Grove Hunt from 1848 to 1876, and died from the effects of a hunting accident in February 1876, aged 70, at Serlby Hall, and was succeeded in the viscountcy by his son George. Lady Galway died in September 1891.

== Notes ==
Parliament of the United Kingdom
Preceded by Granville Harcourt Vernon; Arthur Duncombe	Member of Parliament for East Retford; 1847–1876; With: Arthur Duncombe 1847–1852; William Duncombe 1852–1857; Francis Foljambe 1857–1876	Succeeded by Francis Foljambe; William Beckett-Denison
Peerage of Ireland
Preceded by William Monckton-Arundell	Viscount Galway; 1834–1876	Succeeded by George Monckton-Arundell
