= Mappin baronets =

Title in the Baronetage of the United Kingdom

- Escutcheon of the Mappin baronets of Thornbury
- Creation date: 1886
- Status: extant
- Motto: Cor Forte Calcar Non Requirit, A strong heart needs no spur.
- Arms: Azure on a bend engrailed between two boars' heads erased Argent three lozenges of the field.
- Crest: A boar Sable charged with a pale Or and resting the dexter fore-foot upon a spur fesswise also Or.

The Mappin baronetcy, of Thornbury in the Township of Upper Hallam in the Parish of Sheffield, in the West Riding of the County of York, was a title in the Baronetage of the United Kingdom. It was created on 27 August 1886 for the industrialist and politician Frederick Mappin. He was Mayor of Sheffield in 1877 and Member of Parliament for East Retford from 1880 to 1885, for Hallamshire from 1885 to 1906.

The title became extinct on the death of the 6th Baronet in 1975.

== Mappin baronets, of Thornbury (1886) ==
- Sir Frederick Thorpe Mappin, 1st Baronet (1821–1910)
- Sir Frank Mappin, 2nd Baronet (1846–1920)
- Sir Wilson Mappin, 3rd Baronet (1848–1925)
- Sir Charles Thomas Hewitt Mappin, 4th Baronet (1909–1941)
- Sir Samuel Wilson Mappin, 5th Baronet (1854–1942)
- Sir Frank Crossley Mappin, 6th Baronet (1884–1975), left no heir.

Baronetage of the United Kingdom
Preceded by Palmer baronets	Mappin baronets of Thornbury; 27 August 1886	Succeeded by Kitson baronets
