= Frederick Mappin =

British politician

- Born: 16 May 1821; Sheffield
- Died: 19 March 1910

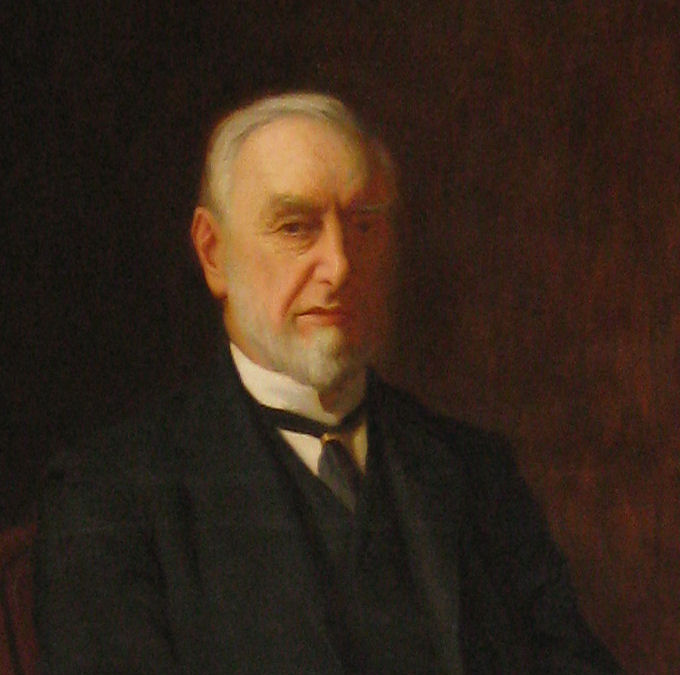
Sir Frederick Thorpe Mappin, Portrait in Mappin Hall, University of Sheffield

Sir Frederick Thorpe Mappin, 1st Baronet (16 May 1821 – 19 March 1910) was an English factory owner and Liberal politician.

Born in Sheffield, Mappin worked for his father's cutlery company from the age of thirteen, running it alone after his father's death in 1841. In 1851, he became the youngest ever Master Cutler, but after a dispute with his younger brother, he left the firm, which later became part of Mappin and Webb.

Mappin then bought a steelworks and implemented machine working, despite a strike by employees. In 1854, he was elected to Sheffield Town Council as a Liberal, stepping down in 1857. In the 1860s, Mappin became a director of the Sheffield Gas and Light Company, and of the Midland Railway. In 1865 Mappin moved into Thornbury, a new country house he had built in Ranmoor, now a Sheffield suburb.

In 1876, Mappin was re-elected to the Town Council, and served as the Mayor of Sheffield in 1877–78. In 1877 Mappin built the Highfield Cocoa and Coffee House to provide non-alcoholic entertainment to the city's working class. In 1878, he was a juror at the Paris Universal Exhibition, and was awarded the Légion d'honneur. At the 1880 general election, he was elected as Member of Parliament for East Retford, while remaining on Sheffield Town Council until 1883. Mappin was a major supporter of the creation of the Sheffield Central Technical School.

Under the Redistribution of Seats Act 1885, Mappin's Parliamentary seat was abolished, and he moved instead to represent Hallamshire, a post he held until 1905. That year, he supported the formation of the University of Sheffield, and was created its first Pro-Chancellor. The University's Sir Frederick Mappin Building is named after him.

He was appointed an honorary Freeman of the City of Sheffield in March 1900.

== Arms ==
Coat of arms of Frederick Mappin

Crest
A boar Sable charged with a pale Or and resting the dexter fore-foot upon a spur fesswise also Or.
Escutcheon
Azure on a bend engrailed between two boars' heads erased Argent three lozenges of the field.
Motto
Cor Forte Calcar Non Requirit

Parliament of the United Kingdom
Preceded by William Beckett-Denison; Francis Foljambe	Member of Parliament for East Retford; 1880–1885; With: Francis Foljambe	Constituency abolished
New constituency	Member of Parliament for Hallamshire; 1885–1905	Succeeded by John Wadsworth
Preceded by Spencer Charrington	Oldest Member of Parliament; 1904–1905	Succeeded by Samuel Young
Baronetage of the United Kingdom
New creation	Baronet (of Thornbury); 1886–1910	Succeeded by Frank Mappin
