= East Retford (constituency) =

Parliamentary constituency in the United Kingdom, 1801–1885

- Former borough constituency for the House of Commons

1572–1885
- Seats: Two
- Created from: Nottinghamshire
- Replaced by: Bassetlaw

East Retford was a parliamentary constituency in Nottinghamshire, which elected two Members of Parliament (MPs) to the House of Commons for the first time in 1316, and continuously from 1571 until 1885, when the constituency was abolished. Although East Retford was technically a parliamentary borough for the whole of its existence, in 1830 its franchise had been widened and its boundaries had been extended to include the whole Wapentake of Bassetlaw as a remedy for corruption among the voters, and from that point onward it resembled a county constituency in most respects.

== History ==
=== The original borough ===
East Retford first sent members to Parliament in 1316, but thereafter the privilege lapsed until the borough was once more summoned to do so in 1571, probably at the instigation of the Earl of Rutland. Certainly, he considered himself entitled to influence its choice of members, and 1586 wrote to the borough asking for the nomination of one or both of the representatives; the borough authorities replied respectfully that "Having considered the matter" they felt themselves "bound to satisfy you in that and any other much weightier thing. May it please you, therefore, to make choice and nominate and we will ratify it." However, they went on to note that they would be particularly happy to oblige if the Earl were to renominate the sitting member, Denzil Holles (who may well have been his nominee at the previous election), and since Rutland proved happy to do so, the proprieties were observed without any hardship. The Earls of Rutland retained their influence in Retford for several decades, often holding the municipal post of High Steward.

The borough consisted initially of the parish of East Retford, a market town which by 1830 had a population of around 2,500. By the end of the 17th century, the right to vote was restricted to the resident freemen of the town, but there was some dispute over who had a right to claim the freedom. (The House of Commons debated the borough's franchise seven times in a few years following 1700, coming to a different resolution each time, and never definitively settling all the details.) East Retford was not subject to the abuses common in many other freeman boroughs, where non-resident freemen could often vote and outnumbered the residents, but as elsewhere the town corporation was able to exert considerable control by deciding whom to admit as freemen. In the second half of the 18th century, the qualified electorate amounted to about 150.

However, the borough was no more independent than it had been in Elizabethan times, and by 1800 had been under the influence of the main local landowner, the Duke of Newcastle, for well over a century. Although it was not quite an entirely safe pocket borough, the Duke could generally be confident of seeing his chosen candidates returned. This influence was strongest in the second half of the 18th century when the borough was managed for the Duke by one of the sitting MPs, John White: there were no contested elections between 1741 and 1796. But even then it was necessary to work to maintain the Duke's popularity among the freemen, and after 1765 the then Duke (who had been Prime Minister until 1761) found his hold on Retford challenged by his nephew, the Earl of Lincoln. As Lincoln was also Newcastle's heir, it might have seemed that the dispute could not permanently weaken the family's control: but in the event the voters had been so stirred up, by the time Lincoln inherited the Dukedom in 1768, that they were unwilling to renounce their independence. Henceforth the Dukes of Newcastle could only count on one of the two seats. When the Corporation candidate was beaten by the Duke's two choices in 1796, the bailiffs and aldermen of the Corporation created 38 honorary freemen to ensure they had a majority once more at the next election; but the Court of King's Bench ruled the manoeuvre illegal (though it was common practice in many other boroughs).

=== Corruption and its consequences ===
With the election results in Retford no longer a foregone conclusion, it became worthwhile for candidates to take some pains to secure victory, and Retford's voters began to exploit the commercial value of their votes. The Newcastle influence became very limited while that of Earl Fitzwilliam waxed (though he himself and his Whig allies were apparently unconvinced of their own power), and the borough eventually became notorious for bribery. Retford's corruption took an unusual form: unlike the voters in most corrupt boroughs, the freemen tried to prevent contested elections, demanding instead that hopeful candidates should buy enough votes to secure a safe majority and avoid the need for a poll. At the elections of 1818 and 1820, the going tariff was 20 guineas for a vote, and the freemen (having two votes each) received 40 guineas for votes they never needed to cast.

But the stability of the system depended on the electors being able to reach a consensus over two candidates who could meet their demands, and a balance had developed whereby the Fitzwilliam interest chose one candidate and the leading members of the corporation the other. Late in 1825, the prospective Corporation candidate for the next election withdrew through ill health, and Lord Fitzwilliam provocatively brought forward a second candidate of his own. The Corporation found another candidate and secured the support of the Tory Duke of Newcastle. The election of 1826 was fought with no holds barred. Both sides bought up all the votes they could at the usual rate, and several pubs were kept open for months before the election, serving free beer from six in the morning until midnight. The Tory stood on a "no popery" platform, with his supporters openly boycotting tradesmen who opposed them, and election day ended in a riot. The two Fitzwilliam candidates won, but the loser petitioned against the result and the extent of East Retford's corruption was displayed to the world.

Parliament was united in being determined to find a remedy for East Retford's misbehaviour, but less clear as to what the most appropriate remedy would be. In the last years of the 18th century, several other boroughs found guilty of similar offences had been "thrown into the hundred" (had their boundaries extended to include the freeholders from the whole surrounding division of the county, so as to ensure that the corrupt townsmen could no longer sway the vote). However, demands for a wider parliamentary reform and a redistribution of seats to the more populous parts of the country were now widespread, and in the most recent corruption case (that of Grampound), the offending borough had been abolished altogether and its seats transferred elsewhere.

There were therefore vigorous debates as to whether Retford's franchise should not be transferred to one of the larger unrepresented towns such as Manchester or Birmingham but both the Tory government and Whig opposition were split on the issue – the harder-line anti-Reform Tories did not want to set a precedent for establishing new boroughs, while many of the Whigs were reluctant to weaken the case for wholesale Reform by making piecemeal improvements. Further complications affected both sides: the Whigs were embarrassed because a leading Whig had been implicated in vote-buying; the Tories were aware that throwing the borough into the hundred (or in Retford's case, the Wapentake) might well re-establish the lost influence of the Duke of Newcastle over the constituency.

The people of Retford themselves were by no means unanimous in wanting to retain the franchise. During the House of Lords debates on the Disfranchisement Bill, it emerged that the town had an active committee, led by a couple of attorneys and meeting at the Turk's Head Inn, trying to make the borough seem even more corrupt than it was and ensure its extinction. One of its members was later seen wearing a handsome gold watch, apparently presented in gratitude by well-wishers in Birmingham!

The first compromise reached by the House of Commons was to put East Retford into the Wapentake while transferring the seats of another guilty borough, Penryn, to Manchester, but the latter bill was defeated in the House of Lords. The question dragged on through the whole of the 1826–30 Parliament, and the Whig amendment to transfer Retford's seats to Birmingham was eventually defeated by 126 votes to 99. The eventually passed Bribery, East Retford Act 1830 (11 Geo. 4 & 1 Will. 4. c. 74) therefore reverted to the earlier practice, and the borough's boundaries were extended to encompass the Wapentake of Bassetlaw (which included the whole of the northern end of Nottinghamshire, including the town of Worksop): all those within this area who were qualified to vote in the county elections were given votes for East Retford.

=== After 1830 ===
This punishment saved East Retford's representation, in name at least. Within a year, Parliament was debating the Great Reform Bill, and the old borough's population was so small that it would have lost one of its seats but the newly extended borough had a population of more than 37,000, and the Reform Act therefore left it untouched. It had 2,312 registered voters at the first reformed election, and around 7,500 after the second extension of the franchise in 1868. It retained its two members until 1885, when the constituency was replaced by an identically delineated single-member county constituency, Bassetlaw.

== Members of Parliament ==
=== MPs 1571–1640 ===
| Parliament | First member | Second member |
|---|---|---|
| 1571 | Henry Draycot | Thomas Broxholme |
| 1572 | Job Throckmorton | George Delves |
| 1584 (Nov) – 1587 | Denzil Holles | Thomas Waad |
| 1586 | Denzil Holles | John Conyers |
| 1588 | George Chaworth | Alexander Radcliffe |
| 1593 | Roger Portington | Anthony Cooke |
| 1597 | Roger Portington | John Roos |
| 1601 | Roger Manners | Robert Kydman |
| 1604 | Sir John Thornhagh | Sir Thomas Darrel |
| 1614 | Sir William Cavendish | Sir Walter Chute |
| 1621 | Sir Nathaniel Rich | Edward Wortley |
| 1624 | John Holles | Sir Francis Wortley |
| 1625 | John, Lord Haughton | Sir Francis Wortley |
| 1626 | John, Lord Haughton | Sir Francis Wortley |
| 1628 | Sir Edward Osborne | Henry Stanhope, Lord Stanhope |
| 1629–1640 | No Parliaments convened | |

=== MPs 1640–1885 ===
| Year | First member | First party | Second member | Second party |
|---|---|---|---|---|
| April 1640 | Sir Gervase Clifton | | Francis Pierrepont | |
| November 1640 | Charles Cavendish | Royalist | Sir Gervase Clifton | Royalist |
| 1644 | Mansfield and Clifton disabled from sitting - both seats vacant | | | |
| 1646 | Francis Thornhagh | Parliamentarian | Sir William Lister | |
| November 1648 | Thornhaugh killed at Battle of Preston - seat vacant | | Sir William Lister | |
| December 1648 | Edward Neville | | Lister excluded in Pride's Purge - seat vacant | |
| 1653 | East Retford was unrepresented in the Barebones Parliament and the First and Second Parliaments of the Protectorate | | | |
| January 1659 | Clifford Clifton | | William Cartwright | |
| May 1659 | Edward Neville | | | |
| 1660 | Sir William Hickman | | Wentworth Fitzgerald | |
| 1661 | Sir William Hickman | | Clifford Clifton | |
| 1670 | Sir William Hickman | | Sir Edward Dering | |
| 1679 | Sir William Hickman | | Sir Edward Nevill | |
| 1685 | John Millington | | Sir Edward Nevill | |
| 1689 | Hon. Evelyn Pierrepont | | John Thornhagh | |
| 1690 | Richard Taylor | | John Thornhagh | |
| 1698 | Sir Willoughby Hickman | | John Thornhagh | |
| January 1701 | Thomas White | | John Thornhagh | |
| April 1701 | Sir Willoughby Hickman | | John Thornhagh | |
| December 1701 | Thomas White | | John Thornhagh | |
| 1702 | Sir Willoughby Hickman | | William Levinz | |
| 1706 | Sir Hardolph Wastneys | | Robert Molesworth | |
| 1708 | William Levinz | | Thomas White | |
| 1710 | Thomas Westby | | Thomas White | |
| 1711 | Willoughby Hickman | Tory | Bryan Cooke | |
| April 1713 | Francis Lewis | | Bryan Cooke | |
| August 1713 | Francis Lewis | | John Digby | |
| 1715 | Thomas White | | John Digby | |
| 1722 | Thomas White | | Patrick Chaworth | |
| 1727 | Thomas White | | Sir Robert Clifton | |
| 1733 | John White | | Sir Robert Clifton | |
| 1741 | John White | | William Mellish | |
| 1751 | John White | | John Shelley | |
| 1768 | Sir Cecil Wray | Whig | John Offley | |
| 1774 | Sir Cecil Wray | Whig | Lord Thomas Pelham-Clinton | |
| 1775 | Sir Cecil Wray | Whig | William Hanger | |
| 1778 | Sir Cecil Wray | Whig | Lord John Pelham-Clinton | |
| 1780 | Wharton Amcotts | | Lord John Pelham-Clinton | |
| 1781 | Wharton Amcotts | | Thomas Pelham-Clinton | |
| 1790 | Sir John Ingilby | | Thomas Pelham-Clinton | |
| 1794 | Sir John Ingilby | | Lt Colonel William Henry Clinton | |
| 1796 | William Petrie | | Sir Wharton Amcotts | |
| 1802 | Lt Colonel Robert Craufurd | | John Jaffray | |
| 1806 | Major General Charles Craufurd | | Thomas Hughan | |
| 1807 | Major General Charles Craufurd | | William Ingilby | |
| 1812 | George Osbaldeston | | Charles Marsh | |
| 1818 | William Evans | | Samuel Crompton | |
| 1826 | William Battie-Wrightson | Whig | Sir Robert Dundas | Whig |
| 1830 | Charles Pierrepont | Whig | Arthur Duncombe | Tory |
| 1831 | Charles Pierrepont | Whig | Granville Harcourt-Vernon | Whig |
| 1835 | Arthur Duncombe | Conservative | Granville Harcourt-Vernon | Whig |
| 1837 | Arthur Duncombe | Conservative | Granville Harcourt-Vernon | Conservative |
| 1847 | Arthur Duncombe | Conservative | George Monckton-Arundell | Conservative |
| 1852 | Hon. William Duncombe | Conservative | George Monckton-Arundell | Conservative |
| 1857 | Francis Foljambe | Whig | George Monckton-Arundell | Conservative |
| 1859 | Francis Foljambe | Liberal | George Monckton-Arundell | Conservative |
| 1876 by-election | Francis Foljambe | Liberal | William Beckett-Denison | Conservative |
| 1880 | Francis Foljambe | Liberal | Frederick Mappin | Liberal |
| 1885 | Constituency abolished | | | |

== Election results ==
=== Elections in the 1830s ===
General election 1830: East Retford
| Party | Candidate | Votes | % | ±% |
|---|---|---|---|---|
| Whig | Charles Pierrepont | 770 | 37.1 | |
| Tory | Arthur Duncombe | 697 | 33.5 | |
| Whig | Granville Harcourt-Vernon | 611 | 29.4 | |
| Turnout | | 1,283 | c. 64.2 | |
| Registered electors | | c. 2,000 | | |
| Majority | | 73 | 3.6 | |
| Whig hold | | Swing | | |
| Majority | | 86 | 4.1 | |
| Tory gain from Whig | | Swing | | |

General election 1831: East Retford
| Party | Candidate | Votes | % | ±% |
|---|---|---|---|---|
| Whig | Granville Harcourt-Vernon | 1,075 | 40.7 | +11.3 |
| Whig | Charles Pierrepont | 954 | 36.2 | −0.9 |
| Tory | Arthur Duncombe | 610 | 23.1 | −10.4 |
| Majority | | 344 | 13.1 | N/A |
| Turnout | | 1,493 | c. 74.7 | c. +10.5 |
| Registered electors | | c. 2,000 | | |
| Whig hold | | Swing | +8.3 | |
| Whig gain from Tory | | Swing | +2.2 | |

General election 1832: East Retford
| Party | Candidate | Votes | % | ±% |
|---|---|---|---|---|
| Whig | Granville Harcourt-Vernon | 1,311 | 38.2 | −2.5 |
| Whig | Charles Pierrepont | 1,153 | 33.6 | −2.6 |
| Tory | John Beckett | 970 | 28.2 | +5.1 |
| Majority | | 183 | 5.4 | −7.7 |
| Turnout | | 1,980 | 85.6 | c. +10.9 |
| Registered electors | | 2,312 | | |
| Whig hold | | Swing | −2.5 | |
| Whig hold | | Swing | −2.6 | |

General election 1835: East Retford
| Party | Candidate | Votes | % | ±% |
|---|---|---|---|---|
| Whig | Granville Harcourt-Vernon | 1,286 | 34.7 | −37.1 |
| Conservative | Arthur Duncombe | 1,252 | 33.8 | +19.7 |
| Conservative | Charles Pelham-Clinton | 1,164 | 31.4 | +17.3 |
| Majority | | 34 | 0.9 | −4.5 |
| Turnout | | 2,199 | 89.4 | +3.8 |
| Registered electors | | 2,459 | | |
| Whig hold | | Swing | −37.1 | |
| Conservative gain from Whig | | Swing | +19.1 | |

General election 1837: East Retford
| Party | Candidate | Votes | % | ±% |
|---|---|---|---|---|
| Conservative | Arthur Duncombe | 1,372 | 34.7 | +0.9 |
| Conservative | Granville Harcourt-Vernon | 1,352 | 34.2 | −0.5 |
| Whig | William Mason | 1,234 | 31.2 | N/A |
| Majority | | 118 | 3.0 | N/A |
| Turnout | | 2,259 | 84.3 | −5.1 |
| Registered electors | | 2,680 | | |
| Conservative hold | | | | |
| Conservative gain from Whig | | | | |

=== Elections in the 1840s ===
General election 1841: East Retford
| Party | Candidate | Votes | % | ±% |
|---|---|---|---|---|
| Conservative | Arthur Duncombe | Unopposed | | |
| Conservative | Granville Harcourt-Vernon | Unopposed | | |
| Registered electors | | 2,785 | | |
| Conservative hold | | | | |
| Conservative hold | | | | |

Duncombe was appointed a Groom in Waiting to Queen Victoria, causing a by-election.

By-election, 2 October 1841: East Retford
| Party | Candidate | Votes | % | ±% |
|---|---|---|---|---|
| Conservative | Arthur Duncombe | Unopposed | | |
| Conservative hold | | | | |

General election 1847: East Retford
| Party | Candidate | Votes | % | ±% |
|---|---|---|---|---|
| Conservative | Arthur Duncombe | Unopposed | | |
| Conservative | George Monckton-Arundell | Unopposed | | |
| Registered electors | | 2,654 | | |
| Conservative hold | | | | |
| Conservative hold | | | | |

=== Elections in the 1850s ===
Duncombe resigned to contest the 1852 by-election in East Riding of Yorkshire, causing a by-election.

By-election, 11 February 1852: East Retford
| Party | Candidate | Votes | % | ±% |
|---|---|---|---|---|
| Conservative | William Duncombe | Unopposed | | |
| Conservative hold | | | | |

Monckton-Arundell was appointed a Lord in Waiting to Queen Victoria, requiring a by-election.

By-election, 19 March 1852: East Retford
| Party | Candidate | Votes | % | ±% |
|---|---|---|---|---|
| Conservative | George Monckton-Arundell | Unopposed | | |
| Conservative hold | | | | |

General election 1852: East Retford
| Party | Candidate | Votes | % | ±% |
|---|---|---|---|---|
| Conservative | William Duncombe | Unopposed | | |
| Conservative | George Monckton-Arundell | Unopposed | | |
| Registered electors | | 2,710 | | |
| Conservative hold | | | | |
| Conservative hold | | | | |

General election 1857: East Retford
| Party | Candidate | Votes | % | ±% |
|---|---|---|---|---|
| Whig | Francis Foljambe | Unopposed | | |
| Conservative | George Monckton-Arundell | Unopposed | | |
| Registered electors | | 2,646 | | |
| Whig gain from Conservative | | | | |
| Conservative hold | | | | |

General election 1859: East Retford
| Party | Candidate | Votes | % | ±% |
|---|---|---|---|---|
| Liberal | Francis Foljambe | Unopposed | | |
| Conservative | George Monckton-Arundell | Unopposed | | |
| Registered electors | | 2,621 | | |
| Liberal hold | | | | |
| Conservative hold | | | | |

=== Elections in the 1860s ===
General election 1865: East Retford
| Party | Candidate | Votes | % | ±% |
|---|---|---|---|---|
| Liberal | Francis Foljambe | Unopposed | | |
| Conservative | George Monckton-Arundell | Unopposed | | |
| Registered electors | | 2,489 | | |
| Liberal hold | | | | |
| Conservative hold | | | | |

General election 1868: East Retford
| Party | Candidate | Votes | % | ±% |
|---|---|---|---|---|
| Liberal | Francis Foljambe | Unopposed | | |
| Conservative | George Monckton-Arundell | Unopposed | | |
| Registered electors | | 7,510 | | |
| Liberal hold | | | | |
| Conservative hold | | | | |

=== Elections in the 1870s ===
General election 1874: East Retford
| Party | Candidate | Votes | % | ±% |
|---|---|---|---|---|
| Liberal | Francis Foljambe | Unopposed | | |
| Conservative | George Monckton-Arundell | Unopposed | | |
| Registered electors | | 7,768 | | |
| Liberal hold | | | | |
| Conservative hold | | | | |

Monckton-Arundell's death caused a by-election.

By-election, 25 Feb 1876: East Retford
| Party | Candidate | Votes | % | ±% |
|---|---|---|---|---|
| Conservative | William Beckett-Denison | 3,538 | 51.4 | N/A |
| Liberal | Henry Fox Bristowe | 3,351 | 48.6 | N/A |
| Majority | | 187 | 2.8 | N/A |
| Turnout | | 6,889 | 84.7 | N/A |
| Registered electors | | 8,131 | | |
| Conservative hold | | | | |

=== Elections in the 1880s ===
General election 1880: East Retford
| Party | Candidate | Votes | % | ±% |
|---|---|---|---|---|
| Liberal | Francis Foljambe | 4,333 | 30.4 | N/A |
| Liberal | Frederick Mappin | 4,134 | 29.0 | N/A |
| Conservative | William Beckett-Denison | 3,021 | 21.2 | N/A |
| Conservative | Henry Eyre | 2,776 | 19.5 | N/A |
| Majority | | 1,113 | 7.8 | N/A |
| Turnout | | 7,132 (est.) | 86.2 (est.) | N/A |
| Registered electors | | 8,278 | | |
| Liberal hold | | Swing | N/A | |
| Liberal gain from Conservative | | Swing | N/A | |
