= George Foljambe =

English cricketer

Personal information
- Born: George Savile Foljambe; 10 October 1856 Worksop, Nottinghamshire
- Died: 13 September 1920 (aged 63)

Sport
- Event: Cricket
- Club: Nottinghamshire County Cricket Club; Oxford University Cricket Club

George Savile Foljambe CB VD (10 October 1856 – 13 September 1920) was an English first-class cricketer active 1879–82 who played for Nottinghamshire and Oxford University. He was born at Osberton Hall, near Worksop, Nottinghamshire, a son of Francis Foljambe, a member of parliament. He was educated at Eton College and Christ Church, Oxford. He served with the Sherwood Foresters until 1913 when he retired with the rank of lieutenant colonel. During World War I he returned to service at the regimental depot, and later served with the Red Cross in France. He was appointed CB in 1917 "in recognition of services during the War. He died in Kensington. His son was the cricketer Edmond Foljambe.
