= John Richard Robinson =

English journalist and newspaper editor

Sir John Richard Robinson
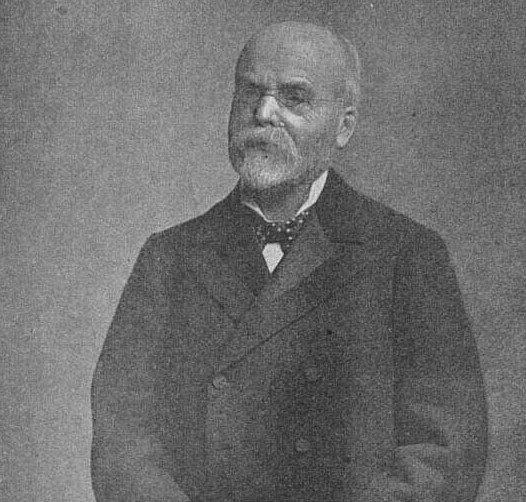
- Born: 2 November 1828; Witham, England
- Died: 30 November 1903 (aged 75); Kensington, England
- Resting place: Highgate Cemetery, London, England
- Education: The Congregational School, Lewisham (now Caterham School)
- Spouse: Jane Mapes
- Relatives: Bertram Fletcher Robinson (nephew)

Sir John Richard Robinson (2 November 1828 – 30 November 1903) was an English journalist, manager and editor of the Daily News. He was also a prominent member of the London-based Reform Club and Guild of Literature and Art.

== Early life and family ==
Born on 2 November 1828 at Witham, Essex, Robinson was the second son of eight children of Richard Robinson, a congregational minister. His wife Sarah was the daughter of John Dennant, also a congregational minister, of Halesworth, Suffolk.

At eleven years of age, Robinson entered the school for the sons of congregational ministers at Lewisham, now Caterham School. Withdrawn from school on 26 June 1843, he was then apprenticed to a firm of booksellers in Shepton Mallet, Somerset.

On 14 July 1859, Robinson married Jane Mapes (died 11 July 1876). She was the youngest daughter of William Granger of the Grange, Wickham Bishops, Essex; and by her he had two sons and one daughter.

Robinson was a paternal uncle to the notable British writer, journalist and editor Bertram Fletcher Robinson. The pair were close and they resided together at Sir John's home in West Kensington between 1901 and 1902.

== Career ==
Robinson's first effort towards journalism was a descriptive account (in the Daily News 14 February 1846) of a meeting of Wiltshire labourers to protest against the Corn Laws. After reporting for the Bedford Mercury, he obtained a post on the Wiltshire Independent at Devizes, and sent regular reports of the local markets to the Daily News.

In 1848 Robinson went to London. Having become a unitarian, he was made sub-editor of a Unitarian journal, The Inquirer, and did most of the work for John Lalor, the editor. His next post was on the Weekly News and Chronicle, under John Sheehan, and in 1855 he became editor of the Express, an evening paper under the same management as the Daily News. At the same time he was a prolific contributor elsewhere. He followed the revolutionary movements of Europe, and was in contact with Giuseppe Mazzini after writing an appreciation. He also knew Lajos Kossuth, Giuseppe Garibaldi, and other leaders.

In 1868, when the price of the Daily News was reduced to one penny, Robinson was appointed manager, and turned the paper around. He saw that the public demanded news not only quickly but in an attractive form. At the opening of the Franco-Prussian War he instructed his correspondents to telegraph descriptive details and not merely bare facts, and after the war was in progress he brought in Archibald Forbes, who became a valuable contributor. At the prompting of another correspondent, John Edwin Hilary Skinner, he started the "French Peasants Relief Fund", which reached a total of £20,000.

On 16 June 1876 Edwin Pears of Constantinople contributed to the Daily News the first of a series of letters, which appeared on 23 June, describing the Batak massacre and other atrocities. Robinson sent out an American journalist, Januarius Aloysius MacGahan, who was accompanied by Eugene Schuyler, the American consul-general in Turkey, to make inquiries. Pears's charges were corroborated. In 1887 Robinson became titular editor, the actual night editing being carried on chiefly by Peter William Clayden.

During 1893, Robinson was knighted on the recommendation of William Ewart Gladstone. The fortunes of the News meanwhile declined. During the Second Boer War in South Africa (1899–1902), Robinson's sympathies were with the Boers. The proprietors changed the policy of the paper to a support of the war, without restoring its prosperity. Then the policy was again reversed by new proprietors, but Robinson resigned in February 1901.

== Associations ==
Robinson was a Reform Club member, and associated with the circle of James Payn, William Black, Sir Wemyss Reid, and George Augustus Sala. He was a regular "first night" visitor to theatres. In 1854 he became a professional member of the Guild of Literature and Art, a society which was founded by Charles Dickens and his friends for the benefit of authors and artists. The guild failed, however, to fulfil the aims of its founders, and Robinson with Frederick Clifford, as the last surviving trustees, arranged for its dissolution in 1897. In 1897 he was chairman of the Newspaper Press Fund dinner, and in 1898 of the Newspaper Society dinner; the former body represented journalists, and the latter proprietors.

== Death ==
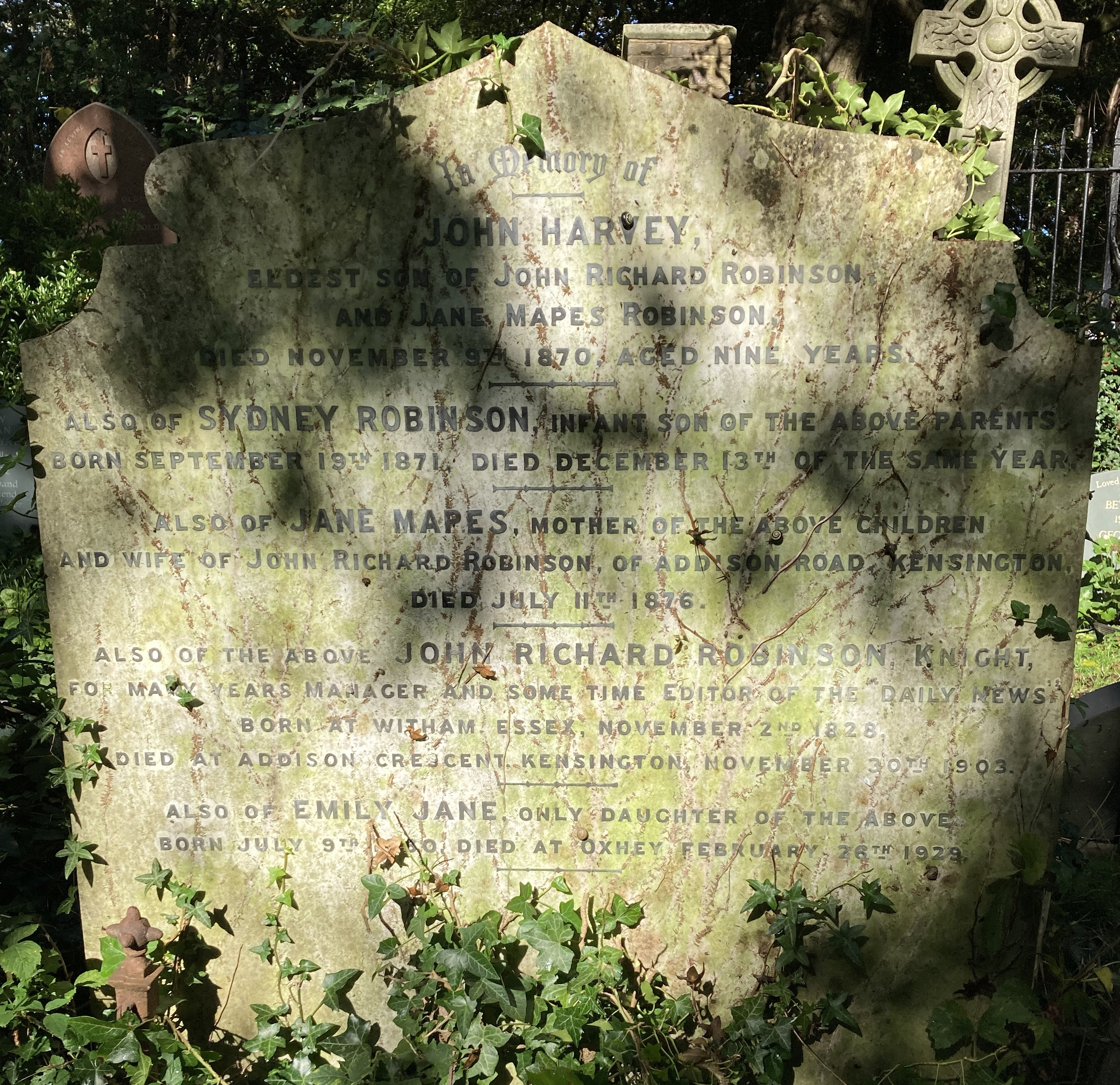
Family grave of Sir John Richard Robinson in Highgate Cemetery

On 30 November 1903, Robinson died of 'cardiac failure and congestion of the lungs' in his home at 4 Addison Crescent, West Kensington, London. The news of his death was reported widely within the British press. Robinson was buried on the eastern side of Highgate Cemetery together with his wife, and their three children.

== See also ==
- Edwin Pears
- Januarius MacGahan

Attribution

This article incorporates text from a publication now in the public domain: Lee, Sidney, ed. (1912). "Robinson, John Richard". Dictionary of National Biography (2nd supplement). Vol. 3. London: Smith, Elder & Co.
