= Philip Richard Morris =

English painter (1836–1902)

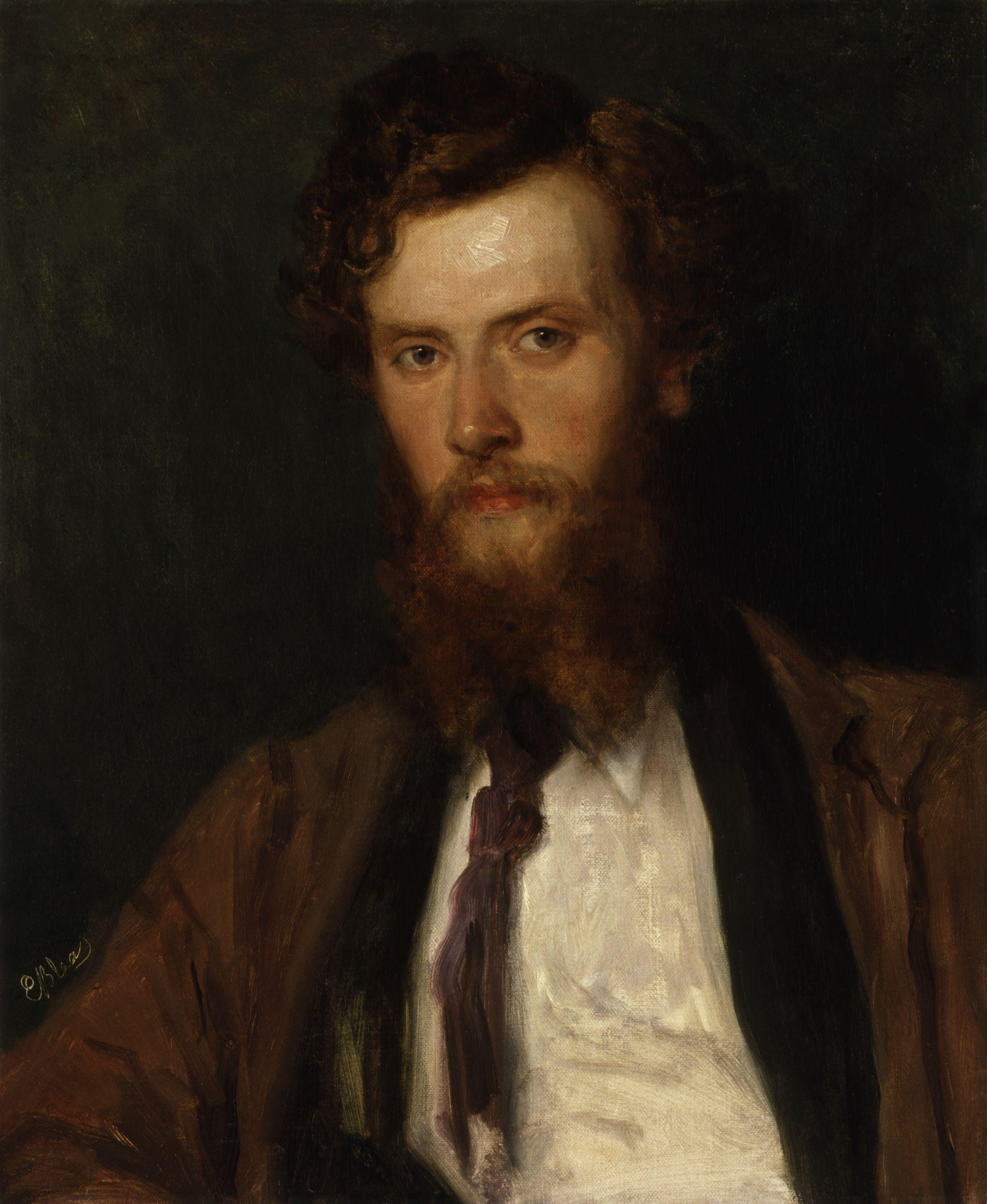
Philip Richard Morris by Eugen von Blaas

Philip Richard Morris ARA (Note: Morris was elected ARA in 1877, but resigned the position in 1900.) (4 December 1836 – 22 April 1902) was an English painter of genre and maritime scenes (particularly allegorical ones of rural life). Morris also painted Holman Hunt-influenced religious paintings and (later in his career), he was commissioned to paint portraits of various Victorian notables.

== Life and Works ==
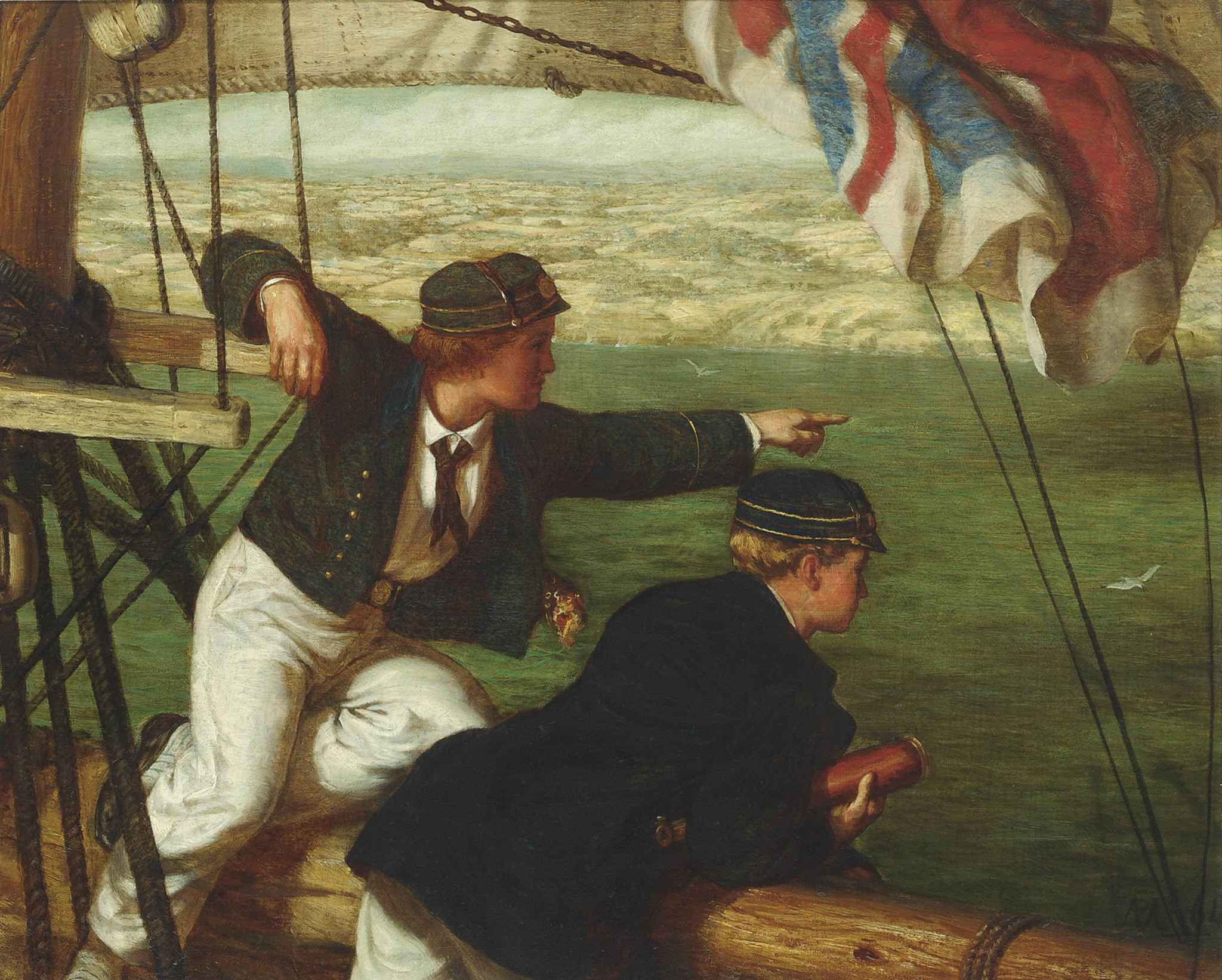
Two Young Midshipmen in Sight of Home, 1864

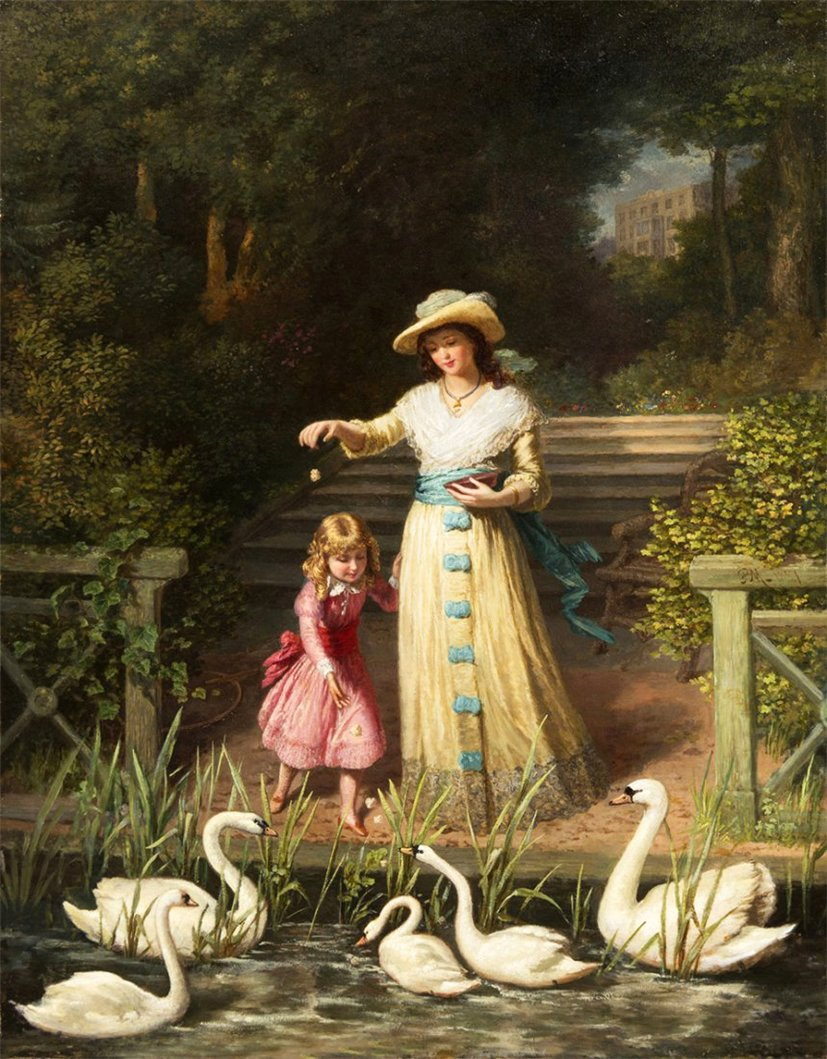
Feeding the swans, 1887

Morris was born in Devonport. Taken to London aged 14 by his iron-founder father to train for the family trade, Philip became increasingly interested in art and, with William Holman Hunt winning round his father, began taking evening drawing classes in the British Museum and (from 1855) in the Royal Academy Schools. At the latter, he used the travelling studentship he won for his The Good Samaritan to fund a journey to Italy and France, remaining there until 1864.

Morris was elected an Associate of the Royal Academy in 1877 (despite his talents and health already being on the wane), though he resigned it in 1900. In 1878 he married a widow, Catherine Sargeantson, the daughter of J. Evans of Llangollen, they had two sons and three daughters. Catherine died in 1886.

During 1902, Philip and Catherine's daughter Gladys Hill Morris (1879–1946), married the noted British sportsman, author, journalist and editor, Bertram Fletcher Robinson. Her younger sister, Florence Mariane Morris (b.1882) married the archaeologist, Alexander Keiller in 1913.

== Death ==
Philip Morris died from ‘Bladder disease (3 years) and heart failure (2 days)’ in Clifton Hill, Maida Vale, London.
