= The Novel Magazine =

British pulp magazine

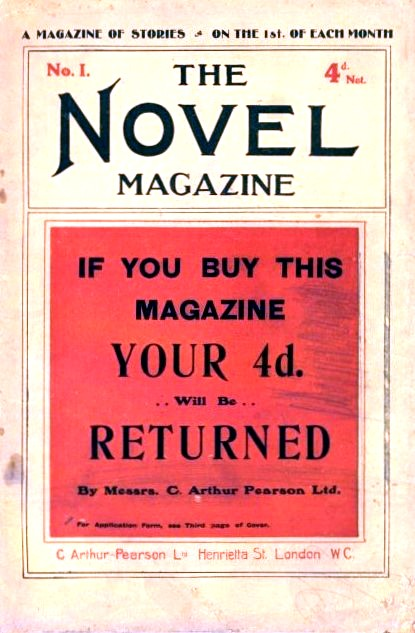
The Novel Magazine, No. 1, 1905.

The Novel Magazine was the first British all-fiction pulp magazine. It was Sir Cyril Arthur Pearson's rival to Sir George Newnes's The Grand Magazine.

Previously titled The Lady's Magazine (January 1901 to June 1904), The Lady's Home Magazine (July 1904 - October 1904) and The Home Magazine of Fiction (November 1904 to March 1905), the first edition of The Novel Magazine was published in April 1905.

Under its final incarnation, The Novel Magazine continued until December 1937 when thereafter, it was subsumed by its rival, The Grand Magazine. Former notable editors of The Novel Magazine included Sir Percy Everett (1905-1912), E. C. Vivian (1912–14 and 1919-1922), and Roy Vickers (1915-1918).

Contributors of fiction to The Novel Magazine and its predecessors included Bertram Fletcher Robinson, Rafael Sabatini, Murray Leinster, Agatha Christie, Elinor Glyn, R. Austin Freeman, Edgar Wallace, Sax Rohmer, Baroness Orczy and P. G. Wodehouse. The Novel Magazine also published ghost stories and weird fiction by Barry Pain, A. M. Burrage, Elliott O'Donnell, and "Theo Douglas" (the pseudonym of H. D. Everett).
