= Bertram Fletcher Robinson =

English sportsman and author (1870–1907)

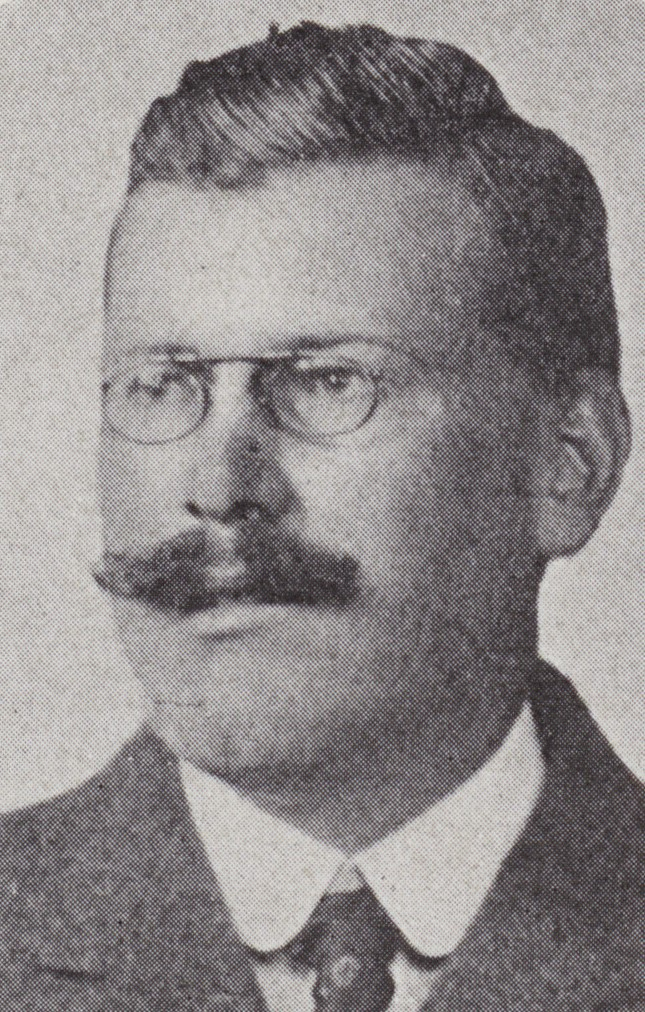
- Bertram Fletcher Robinson pictured during his tenure as 'Day Editor' of the Daily Express newspaper (c. 1901)
- Born: 22 August 1870; Liverpool, England
- Died: 21 January 1907 (aged 36); Belgravia, London, England
- Resting place: St. Andrew's Church, Ipplepen, Devon, England
- Education: Newton Abbot Proprietary College
- Alma mater: Jesus College, Cambridge
- Occupations: Sportsman, barrister, journalist, author, editor, political activist
- Spouse: Gladys Hill Morris
- Relatives: Sir John Robinson (uncle); Philip Morris (father-in-law)

Bertram Fletcher Robinson (22 August 1870 – 21 January 1907) was an English sportsman, barrister, journalist, editor, author and Liberal Unionist Party activist. During his life-time, he wrote at least three hundred items, including a series of short stories that feature a detective called 'Addington Peace'. Following his untimely death at the age of just 36 years, speculation grew that Robinson was the victim of a curse bestowed upon him by an Egyptian antiquity at the British Museum, which he had researched whilst working as a journalist for a British newspaper. However, Robinson is perhaps best remembered for his literary collaborations with his friends and fellow Crimes Club members, Arthur Conan Doyle, P. G. Wodehouse and Max Pemberton.

== Early life ==
=== Family ===
Bertram Fletcher Robinson (Aka 'Bobbles' or 'Bertie') was born on 22 August 1870 at 80 Rose Lane, Mossley Hill in Liverpool. During 1882, he relocated with his family to Park Hill House at Ipplepen in Devon.

Robinson's father, Joseph Fletcher Robinson (1827–1903) was the founder of a general merchant business in Liverpool (c. 1867), which is now called Meade-King, Robinson & Company Limited (also known as 'MKR'). Previously, around 1850, Joseph had travelled to South America where he was befriended by Giuseppe Garibaldi and fought alongside him, and the Uruguayans, against the Argentine dictator, Juan Manuel de Rosas in the Guerra Grande.

Robinson's uncle, Sir John Richard Robinson (1828–1903), was the long-time editor-in-chief of the Daily News and also a prominent committee member of the Liberal Reform Club. His friends included James Payn, William Black, Sir Wemyss Reid, George Augustus Sala and Sir Arthur Conan Doyle.

On 3 June 1902, 31‑year‑old Robinson married 22-year-old Gladys Hill Morris at St. Barnabas Church, Kensington, London. Gladys was an actress and a daughter of the noted Victorian era artist Philip Richard Morris ARA (1833–1902). The Robinsons had no children of their own but they were godparents to Geraldine Winn Everett, the daughter of Sir Percy Everett. 'Winn', as she was affectionately referred to by both family and friends, later worked as a GP in Essex.

=== Education ===
Between 1882 and 1890, Robinson was schooled at Newton Abbot Proprietary College, which was directed by the headmaster, George Townsend Warner. Robinson was educated alongside Percy Harrison Fawcett who later became a famous explorer of South America. Later, their mutual friend, Sir Arthur Conan Doyle, would use Fawcett's Amazonian field reports as the inspiration for his popular novel, The Lost World.

Between 1890 and 1894, Robinson attended Jesus College, Cambridge, which was directed by the Master, Dr. Henry Arthur Morgan. He studied both History and Law and was awarded a Second Class History Tripos Bachelor of Arts degree (1893), Part I of the Law Tripos Bachelor of Arts degree (1894) and a Master of Arts degree (1898).

During his time as an undergraduate, Robinson won three Rugby Football Blues and, according to his obituary in the Daily Express (22 January 1907), he would have played rugby union for England but for an 'accident'. Robinson also represented his college in cricket and rowing, and was a member of the Jesus College crew, which won the Thames Challenge Cup at the Henley Royal Regatta on 7 July 1892. On 12 February 1894, The Times reported that Robinson was trialled for the position of fourth oar with the Cambridge 'Trial Eight' ahead of the annual Oxford and Cambridge Boat Race (The Boat Race 1894).

On 17 June 1896, it was reported within the Council of Legal Education section of The Times newspaper that Robinson had passed the Bar examination. He accepted the resulting call to join the Inner Temple, which made him a qualified Barrister but he never practised this profession.

== Writing and editorial career ==
=== Versatility and output ===
Robinson held editorial positions with The Newtonian (1887–1889), the Granta (1893–1895), Daily Express (July 1900 – May 1904), Vanity Fair (May 1904 – October 1906), The World (journal) (October 1906 – January 1907) and The Gentleman's Magazine (January 1907). He also edited eight books about various sports and pastimes for The Isthmian Library (1897–1901).

Between 1893 and 1907, writing under the pen name of B. Fletcher Robinson, Robinson authored or coauthored at least 44 articles (for 15 different periodicals), 55 short stories, four lyrics, 128 bylined newspaper reports, 24 poems and eight books. He also made contributions to the plots of two Sherlock Holmes stories written by Arthur Conan Doyle (1900-1903) and produced nine satirical playlets, four of which were collaborations with P. G. Wodehouse (1903-1907).

=== Early work (1893–1903) ===
Between 1893 and 1895, Robinson had one playlet and 12 poems published in the Granta. This periodical was targeted at Cambridge undergraduates but it also reported on matters relating to Trinity College (Dublin) and Oxford University. Granta was founded in 1889 by R. C. Lehmann (who later became a major contributor to Punch and replaced Robinson's uncle as the editor of the Daily News). It provided comment on student politics, news and badinage.

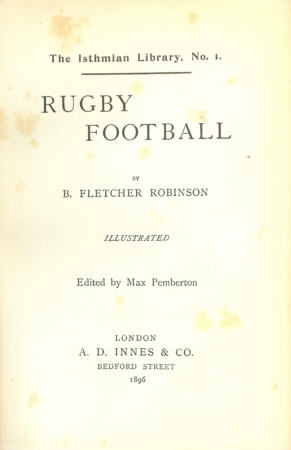
Title page of Rugby Football (1896)

In December 1896, the position of editor at Cassell's Family Magazine passed from the Reverend Henry George Bonavia Hunt to the popular novelist, Max Pemberton. Pemberton had recently edited Robinson's first book titled Rugby Football for The Isthmian Library before relinquishing to him the position of editor. Between March 1897 and April 1900, Robinson wrote 25 items for the Cassell's periodical, which included a series of five articles about the major cities of Europe titled Capitals at Play (January–May 1898), a series of six articles about night-shift workers titled London Night by Night (June–November 1899) and six articles about the British military titled Famous Regiments (December 1899 – May 1900).

In January 1899, Robinson had a non-fictional article titled The Duke's Hounds. A Chat about the Badminton published in Cassell's Magazine (pp. 206–210). This article describes the membership and history of the Gloucestershire Hunt and it is illustrated throughout with photographs. Both Robinson and his father, were members of the South Devon Hunt and Dart Vale Harriers until 1895.

In July 1899, the first of Robinson's 55 short stories titled Black Magic: The Story of the Spanish Don was published in the renamed Cassell's Magazine. This story is illustrated by F. H. Townsend and it is told in the first-person narrative by an old Sailor to an educated gentleman in a pub overlooking a Cornish harbour. The narrator recalls meeting a strange Spanish-speaking passenger (the 'Don'), aboard a trading brig, during a voyage to Africa around 1856. It transpires that the Don has recently murdered his friend for gold. The Don becomes convinced that the murdered man has possessed a shark, which is following the ship and is intent on exacting revenge against him. References to nautical terms, kerosene and palm-oil, suggest that Robinson may have adapted this story from tales told to him by his father.

In March 1900, Robinson had an item titled A True Story (Wherein all golfers may learn something to their advantage), published in Pearson's Magazine. This periodical was owned by the British newspaper magnate and publisher, Cyril Arthur Pearson. It appears that Pearson admired Robinson's ongoing series of articles about the British military in Cassell's Magazine because during the Spring of 1900, he recruited Robinson to work as his chief war correspondent for his new daily newspaper, the Daily Express. Launched on 24 April 1900, this tabloid was the first British daily newspaper to put news on the front page. Robinson's first assignment was to travel to South Africa to report on the Second Boer War and between 4 May and 30 June 1900, he had 13 related dispatches published in the Daily Express. Once again, Pearson appeared impressed because he recalled Robinson to London and promoted him to the position of 'Day Editor' of the Daily Express.

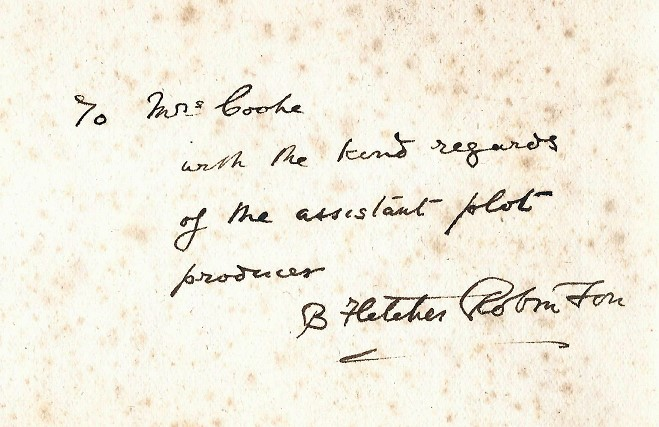
Robinson's handwritten inscription in a first book edition of The Hound of the Baskervilles (1902), which he presented to his friend's wife

In July 1900, Robinson and the creator of Sherlock Holmes, Arthur Conan Doyle, 'cemented' their friendship while they were aboard a passenger ship that was travelling to Southampton from Cape Town. The following year, Robinson told Doyle legends of ghostly hounds, recounted the supernatural tale of Squire Richard Cabell III and showed him around grimly atmospheric Dartmoor. The pair had previously agreed to co-author a Devon-based story but in the end, their collaboration led only to Doyle's novel The Hound of the Baskervilles, which was first published in book form by George Newnes Ltd on 25 March 1902. Robinson himself was content to concede that his part in this collaboration was restricted to that of an 'assistant plot producer'. Befittingly, Doyle wrote the following acknowledgement note, which featured within the first of nine monthly instalments of this story, when it commenced serialisation in The Strand Magazine from August 1901:

This story owes its inception to my friend, Mr. Fletcher Robinson, who has helped
me both in the general plot and in the local details. — A.C.D.

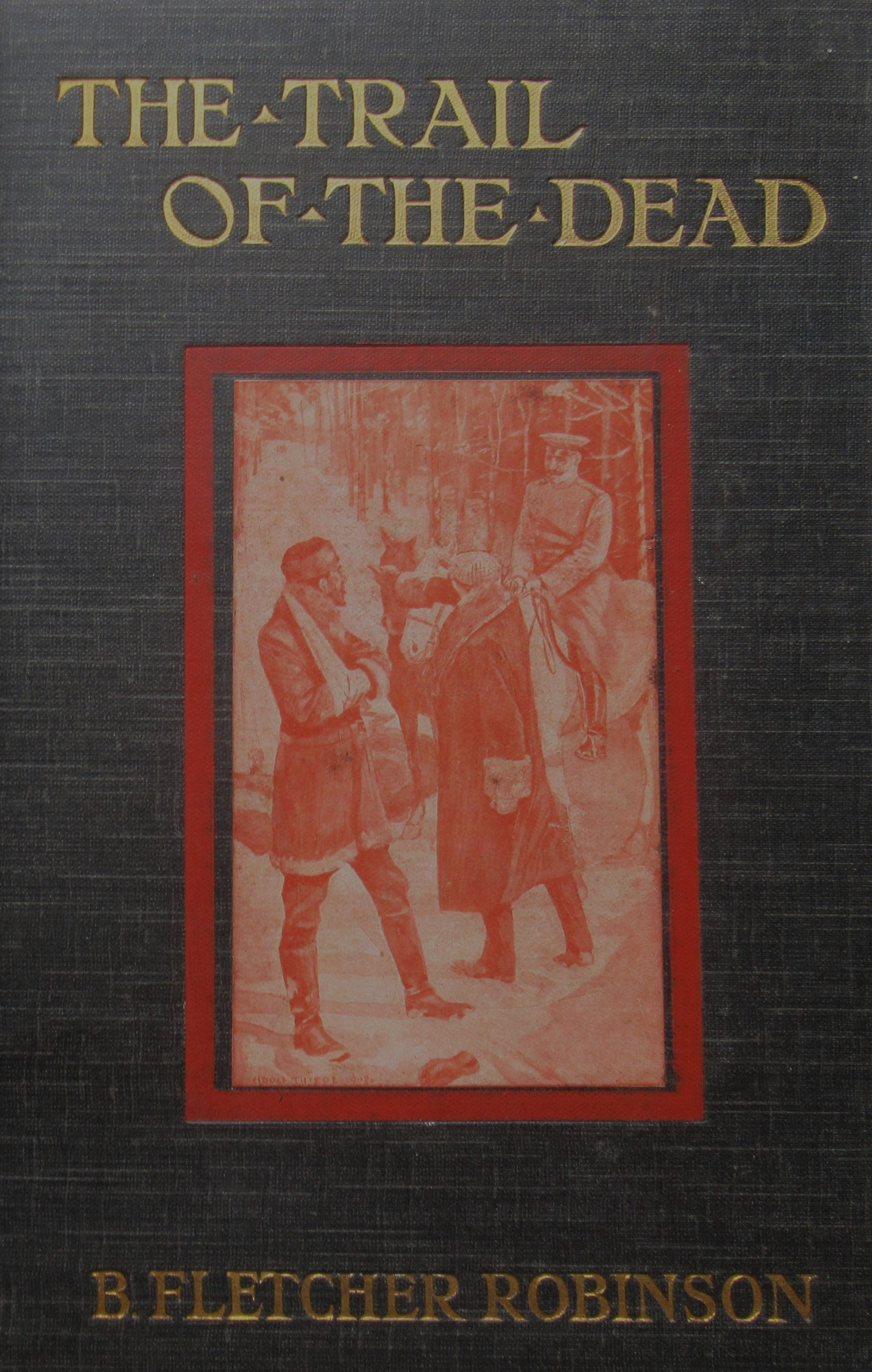
Book cover of The Trail of the Dead (1904)

Between December 1902 and August 1903, The Windsor Magazine published seven short stories of adventure fiction by Robinson and Malcolm Fraser, under the collective title of The Trail of the Dead: The Strange Experience of Dr. Robert Harland. In February 1904, six of these stories were republished in a book titled The Trail of the Dead (Ward, Lock & Co.), which is illustrated by Adolf Thiede. During 1998, the seventh story, titled 'Fog Bound', was republished as 'Fogbound' in a compendium of short stories, which was edited by Jack Adrian and titled Twelve Tales of Murder. In April 2009, all seven tales were included and republished in a book titled Aside Arthur Conan Doyle: Twenty Original Tales by Bertram Fletcher Robinson, which was compiled by Paul Spiring.

During 1903, Robinson also contributed an idea to the plot of a second Sherlock Holmes short story, The Adventure of the Norwood Builder. This is one of the very few Holmes stories in which a fingerprint provides a good clue to the nature of the problem. The pivotal wax thumbprint reproduction idea was devised by Robinson, and Doyle paid him a fee of £50 (equivalent to £5,000 in 2023) for the use of it. The story was first published in Collier's (US) on 31 October 1903 and in The Strand Magazine (UK) in November 1903, and it also features as the second tale in the 1905 collection of 13 Sherlock Holmes stories titled The Return of Sherlock Holmes.

During May 1903, Robinson had a short story titled The Battle of Fingle's Bridge published in Pearson's Magazine (Vol. XV, pp. 530–536). This is a fairy tale, told by a small boy who falls asleep on a moor and witnesses a battle between the people of the ferns and rushes and the people of the gorse and heather. All these people are only six inches tall and are dressed in medieval garb and armour and have miniature horses and weapons. The boy, aided by a fairy, becomes involved in the battle and finally awakens to find signs of the battle on the moor. There is a Fingle Bridge, over the River Teign, which is a famous tourist beauty spot near Drewsteignton, on the North-Eastern borders of Dartmoor. This story was illustrated by Nathan Dean.

On 14 September 1903, the British Liberal Unionist Party politician, Joseph Chamberlain resigned his position within the cabinet of the Conservative-led coalition government of Prime Minister, Arthur Balfour. Robinson responded to this news by writing the lyrics to a popular song titled "The John Bull's Store", which was published as sheet music by Elkin & Company Limited (London). Robinson's song extols the virtues of Chamberlain and the Tariff Reform League (or 'TRL') and it is set to music that was composed by Robert Eden and first arranged by Herman Finck. "The John Bull’s Store" was performed publicly in London's West End theatre by the D'Oyly Carte Opera Company and recordings were made by various artists including the male baritone vocalists David Brazell and Leo Stormont. Following this endeavour, Robinson and Eden collaborated on a second popular song titled "The Little Loafer", which decries free trade and espouses imperial preference. This collaboration was also published as sheet music by Elkin & Company Limited during January 1904.

During the final quarter of 1903, under Robinson's editorship, the Daily Express newspaper published a series of 48 poems, which were collectively titled The Parrot. Under the slogan, 'Your food will cost you more' these satirical poems lambast the tax law policies of Arthur Balfour's Government and they commend the cause of the TRL, which at this time was chaired by Robinson's employer, Cyril Arthur Pearson. All but one of this series of poems was published on the newspaper's front page alongside the daily headlines. None carried a by-line, but it appears that P. G. Wodehouse contributed 19 of these poems, and Robinson the remainder. Just two years later, the Liberal Party led by Henry Campbell-Bannerman, achieved a landslide victory in the 1906 British General Election and Balfour lost his own parliamentary seat in Manchester East.

=== Later work (1904–1907) ===
Book cover of The Chronicles of Addington Peace (1905)

Between December 1903 and January 1907, Robinson (‘Bobbles’) and P. G. Wodehouse (‘Plum’), co-wrote four playlets, which were published in three different periodicals. Each playlet is written in the style of a pantomime and they lampoon notable opponents of the TRL and imperial preference within the late Victorian and early Edwardian eras. During July 2009, these playlets were compiled and republished in facsimile form by Paul Spiring in a book titled Bobbles & Plum. This book also features a foreword by Hilary Bruce, the Chairman of The PG Wodehouse Society (UK), an introduction by the acclaimed Wodehouse scholars, Lieutenant-Colonel Norman T.P. Murphy and Tony Ring and annotations by W.S. Gilbert scholar, Andrew Crowther.

Between August 1904 and January 1905, Robinson had the first in a series of six new detective short-stories published in The Lady's Home Magazine. In June 1905, these six stories together with two new ones were collected and published in a book, which is illustrated by Thomas Heath Robinson (no relation) and titled The Chronicles of Addington Peace (Harper & Brothers). The main protagonist 'Detective Inspector Addington Peace' works for Scotland Yard within their Criminal Investigation Department and he is partnered by a Dr. Watson-like biographer, neighbour and artist called 'James Phillips'. Upon their first encounter, Phillips describes Peace as follows:

… a tiny slip of a fellow, of about five and thirty years of age. A stubble of brown hair, a hard, clean-shaven mouth, and a confident chin are my first impression.

During September 1904, Robinson had a non-fictional article entitled The Fortress of the First Britons. A Description of the Fortress of Grimspound, on Dartmoor published in Pearson's Magazine (Vol. XVIII, pp. 273–280). This article is illustrated throughout with both drawings and photographs and it was republished during 2008 by Brian Pugh and Paul Spiring in their biography about Robinson, which is titled Bertram Fletcher Robinson: A Footnote to the Hound of the Baskervilles.

In January 1905, Robinson had a short story titled The Power of the Press published in the American literary magazine, The Smart Set. This monthly periodical was founded during 1903 in New York by William d'Alton Mann and it provided a large readership to emergent authors. This story is set in Wolfstein in Germany and it centres on a failed plot, which is conceived by the Chief-of-Police, to falsely incriminate a journalist of being an Anarchist.

In July 1905, Robinson was invited to make a contribution to a regular section titled My Best Story in The Novel Magazine. This periodical was owned by his former employer, Cyril Arthur Pearson and it was edited by his close friend, Percy Everett. In the preamble to his featured story, The Debt of Heinrich Hermann, Robinson wrote:

Sir Arthur Conan Doyle is a type of the strong, clear-headed, generous Englishman [sic], a very contrast to all that appertains to decadence. Yet there are many horrors in ‘Sherlock Holmes’. It was from assisting him in ‘The Hound of the Baskervilles’ that I obtained my first lesson in the art of story construction. Imagination without that art is poor enough.

This quote is the last recorded comment made by Robinson about his collaboration with Doyle over The Hound of the Baskervilles. Writing in The Sherlock Holmes Journal during 2009, Paul Spiring asserts that it is '...important for several reasons. Firstly, it reveals that Robinson continued to hold Doyle in high esteem some four years after the story was published. Secondly, it reveals that it was Doyle that devised...the narrative.’ Nevertheless, Doyle paid Robinson a 1/3 Royalty payment for his contributions to the story, which amounted to over £500 (equivalent to £50,900 in 2023) by the end of 1901.

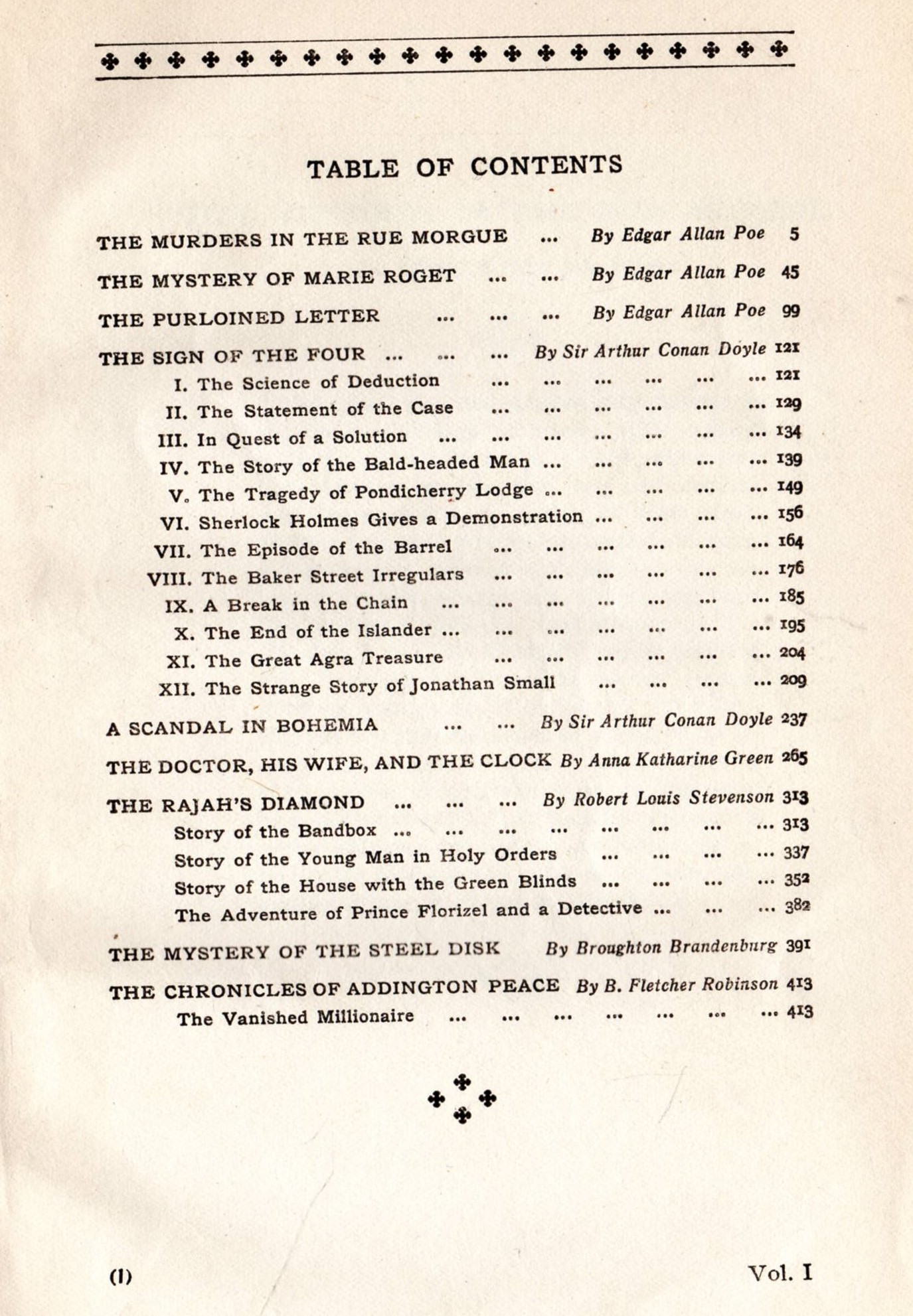
Contents page for Great Short Stories Volume 1: Detective Stories (1906)

During 1906, P. F. Collier & Son of New York published the first in a series of three anthologies entitled Great Short Stories, Volume 1 (1): Detective Stories, which was edited by William Patten. This book features 12 stories written by Broughton Brandenburg (one), Arthur Conan Doyle (two), Anna Katharine Green (one), Edgar Allan Poe (three) and Robert Louis Stevenson (four). The twelfth and final story is The Vanished Millionaire by Robinson and it is preceded by the following introduction:

Fletcher Robinson is a London Journalist, the editor of "Vanity Fair," and author of a dozen detective stories in which are recorded the startling adventures of Mr. Addington Peace of Scotland Yard. He collaborated with Conan Doyle in "The Hound of the Baskervilles." When some of these stories appeared in the American magazines, for an unexplained reason (presumably editorial) the name of the hero was changed to Inspector Hartley.

On 7 June 1906, Robinson had a short story titled The Mystery of Mr. Nicholas Boushaw published in Vanity Fair (pp. 725–726). This 9th and final Addington Peace story is much shorter than the preceding eight stories and the narrator is not specifically involved in the case in the same way that Phillips is in the other stories. In this story, Peace logically deduces that the body of a missing man has been hidden in a recently dug grave within a cemetery. Robinson records in a footnote to this story, that a real-life murderer had concealed the body of his victim in this way and that the body went undiscovered for 11 years. The story is set within a fictional village called ‘Crone’ in Dorset. The description of Crone bears a closer resemblance to Newton Abbot than to anywhere in Dorset. There is also an interesting reference to a nearby location called 'Heatree' in the story. There is no village or town called Heatree in Dorset, or anywhere else in England, but there is a 'Heatree House' on the edge of Dartmoor near the infamous Jay's Grave.

In January 1907, during the same month as his death, Robinson's 55th and final short story titled How Mr. Denis O'Halloran Transgressed His Code was published in Appleton's Magazine. This story is set in England at about the time of the Battle of Culloden and the exploits of Bonnie Prince Charlie and it centres upon a tragic domestic dispute between one 'Colonel Francis Yorke' and his stepmother. The story is illustrated by the noted American artist and illustrator, Arthur E. Becher.

== Death ==
Robinson was employed by Lord Northcliffe until shortly before his death

Bertram Fletcher Robinson died aged 36 years on 21 January 1907, at 44 Eaton Terrace, Belgravia, London. The official cause of his death is recorded as 'enteric fever (3 weeks) and peritonitis (24 hours)'. His friend, Sir Max Pemberton reported that Robinson had become ill after drinking contaminated water during a visit to the Paris Motor Show in December 1906. However, other contemporaries with a bent for the occult attributed Robinson's death to a curse associated with an Egyptian artefact called the Unlucky Mummy, which he had investigated in 1904, and which would later be linked to the sinking of RMS Titanic.

Obituaries were published in various British magazines including Vanity Fair, The Athenaeum, The Illustrated London News and The Gentleman's Magazine. Further obituaries appeared in dozens of national and regional newspapers including The World, The Times, Daily Express, Daily Mirror, Weekly Dispatch, The Daily News, The Sphere, The Morning Post, The Globe, Evening Standard, Western Morning News and The Sporting Times. The English poet and journalist, Jessie Pope also wrote the following elegy to Robinson, which was published in the Daily Express on 26 January 1907:

Good Bye, kind heart; our benisons preceding,
Shall shield your passing to the other side.
The praise of your friends shall do your pleading
In love and gratitude and tender pride.
To you gay humorist and polished writer,
We will not speak of tears or startled pain.
You made our London merrier and brighter,
God bless you, then, until we meet again!

== Funeral and memorial services ==
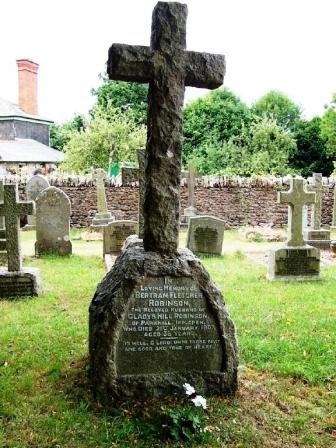
Robinson's grave at St. Andrew's Church, Ipplepen

At 3:30pm on Thursday 24 January 1907, a funeral service was held for Robinson at St. Andrew's Church in Ipplepen. His friend, Sir Arthur Conan Doyle was unable to attend either the funeral service or the subsequent memorial service because he was at that time, busily campaigning for the release from prison of one George Edalji. Doyle did, however, send a floral tribute to the funeral service, with the handwritten message 'In loving memory of an old and valued friend from Arthur Conan Doyle.' Another message read 'From ‘Our Society’, with deepest regrets from fellow members'. Robinson was buried in a grave beside that of his parents.

At 4:00pm on Thursday 24 January 1907, The Reverend Septimus Pennington conducted a memorial service for Robinson at St. Clement Danes, Strand, London. According to a report in the Daily Express newspaper (Saturday 26 January 1907), the congregation included the following notable figures: Arthur Hammond Marshall, (Sir) Owen Seaman, (Sir) Max Pemberton, (Sir) Cyril Arthur Pearson, (Sir) Percy Everett, (Lord) Alfred Harmsworth, (Sir) Joseph Lawrence, Sir Felix Semon (Physician to the King), Sir William Bell, (Sir) Anthony Hope, Clement King Shorter, (Sir) Leslie Ward ('Spy'), Thomas Anstey Guthrie, (Sir) Evelyn Wrench and Henry Hamilton Fyfe. The congregation sang Peace, Perfect Peace (hymn), which was written by the former Bishop of Exeter, Edward Henry Bickersteth in 1875.

== Posthumous recognition ==
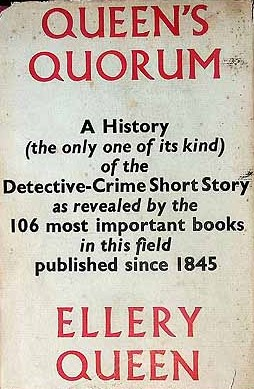
Queen's Quorum (Victor Gollancz Ltd, London, 1953)

During 1949, Ellery Queen's Mystery Magazine listed Robinson's The Chronicles of Addington Peace as one of the most influential collections of crime short stories ever written. 'Ellery Queen' was the name of a fictional American detective created by the writing partnership of Frederic Dannay and Manfred B. Lee. The former was principally responsible for compiling the historical index of crime fiction, which was titled Queen's Quorum: A History of the Detective-Crime Short Story as Revealed by the 106 Most Important Books Published in This Field Since 1845. The first book version of this index was published in 1951 by (Little, Brown and Company, Boston). However, supplements were published until 1969, by which time the index had increased to 125 titles.

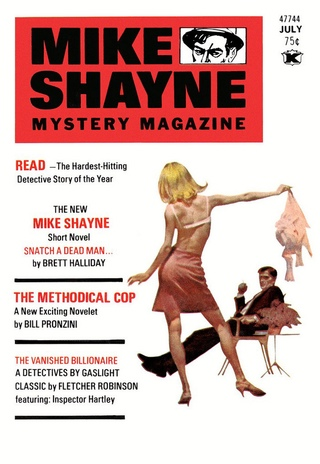
Cover of Mike Shayne Mystery Magazine (1973)

In July 1973, Robinson's Addington Peace Story titled The Vanished Millionaire was republished as The Vanished Billionaire in the Mike Shayne Mystery Magazine. This influential American pulp digest magazine ran for nearly 30 years and it specialised in the publication of classic fiction from the horror, mystery and crime genres. The Vanished Billionaire was first published in the United States in February 1905 but it was slightly re-written to meet the requirements of the American readership. In his introduction to this story, the writer and critic Sam Moskowitz offers the following assessment of Robinson's two collections of short stories:

A very remarkable series he wrote was The Trail of the Dead…six connected stories which ran…after he had assisted…Doyle on The Hound of The Baskervilles. This series contains a full mosaic of background horror which Robinson managed to inject into those stories and introduced Sir Henry Graden, famous explorer and scientist cast in the detective's role. His nemesis was Rudolf Marnac, an arch criminal that almost made Professor Moriarty seem like a gentle, reasonable sort of soul. Those stories, like others of Robinson's were not published in the United States. However, he achieved a popular reception in America with his Inspector Hartley stories…The waspish little inspector from Scotland Yard proved a brilliant diagnostician of the most confounding clues. The Vanished Billionaire is an excellent example of the indomitable Inspector Hartley in action…His works are well worth reviving.

== Posthumous speculation ==
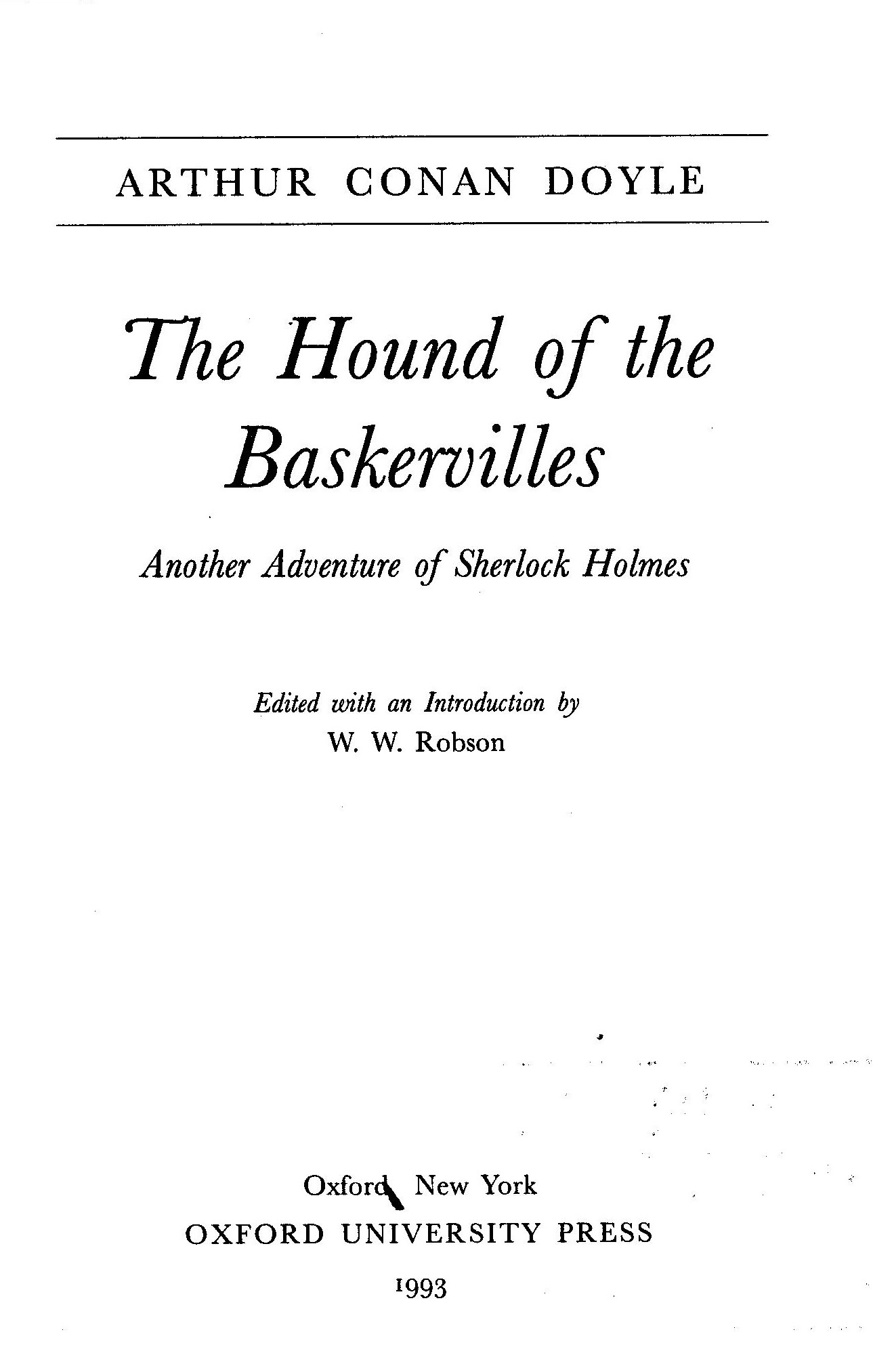
Titlepage of The Oxford Sherlock Holmes edition of The Hound of the Baskervilles (1993)

During 1993, in his 'Introduction' to The Oxford Sherlock Holmes edition of The Hound of the Baskervilles, the Devon-born literary critic and scholar, Professor William Wallace Robson wrote that the 'exact role of Robinson in the concoction of The Hound of the Baskervilles may now be impossible to determine … The most probable solution to the question of authorship is that the legend recounted by Robinson, whatever exactly it was, pulled the creative trigger'. Professor Robson adds that once the element of Sherlock Holmes was added to the original idea, the novel evolved beyond the joint project that was originally posited.

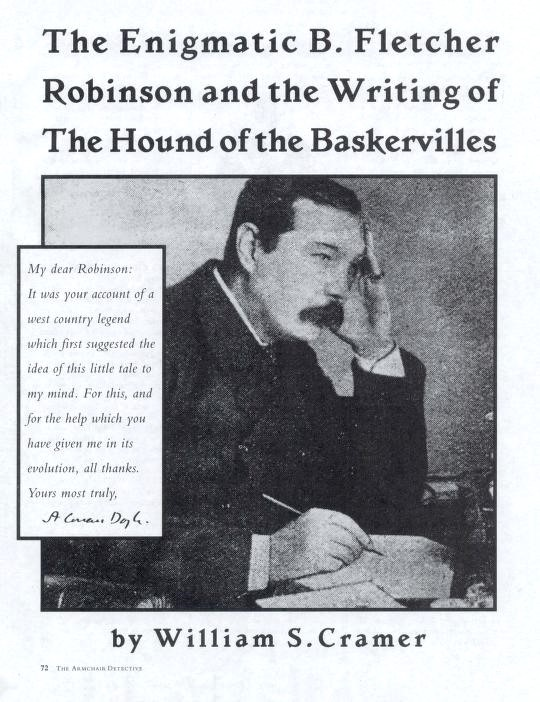
Headline page of The Enigmatic B. Fletcher Robinson by William Cramer (1993)

In September 1993, William S. Cramer had an article titled The Enigmatic B. Fletcher Robinson and the Writing of The Hound of the Baskervilles published in The Armchair Detective (Vol. 26, No. 4, pp. 72–76). This periodical was founded in the autumn of 1967 by the well-known crime fan and bibliographer Allen J. Hubin. Cramer worked as an assistant professor and Reference Librarian at Oakland State University in Michigan. Conjecturing upon the extent of Doyle's collaboration with Robinson over The Hound of the Baskervilles, Cramer concludes:

So, the last summation to this intriguing literary mystery would seem to be that Doyle was amenable to a collaboration, perhaps even encouraging it, but Robinson for reasons unknown and unknowable rejected this proposal. A very private individual who left no personal record for researchers to delve into, one can only surmise that he wanted to concentrate on his journalistic endeavors [sic] and choose not to spend his time and energies writing fiction.

During 2007, British teacher and Chartered Biologist, Paul Spiring wrote three articles about the circumstances surrounding the collaboration between Doyle and Robinson over The Hound of the Baskervilles, for the now defunct website, BFRonline.BIZ (2007–2017). In the third and final item titled The Hound of the Baskervilles (Conclusion), Spiring speculates that Robinson was content to settle for footnote acknowledgments within the first serialised and book editions of the story, due to six pressing personal and professional considerations. Spiring also reports that Robinson conceded to friends that his contribution to the venture was limited to that of an 'assistant plot producer'.

== Legacy ==
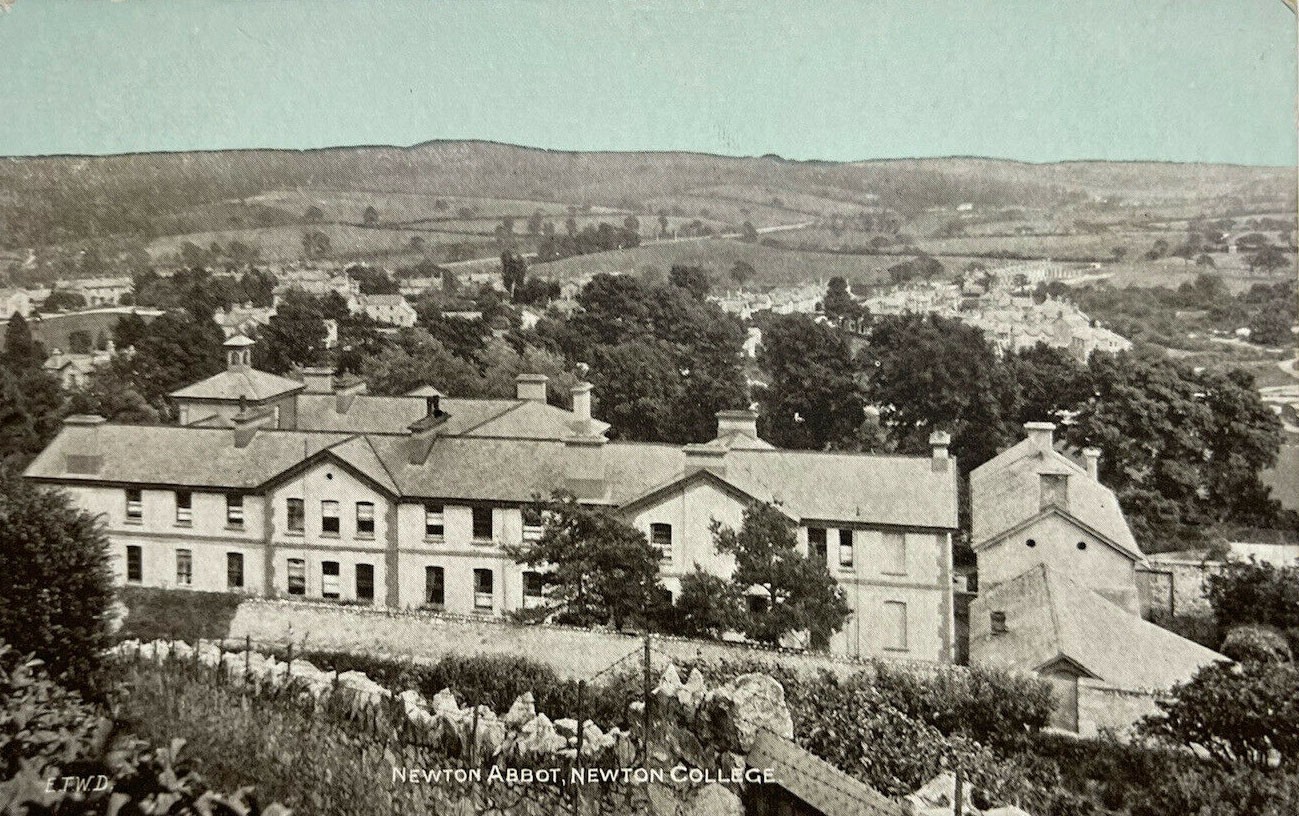
Newton College (c. 1903), which was previously called 'Newton Abbot Proprietary College'

Shortly before his death, Robinson had commissioned Charles Eamer Kempe to design a stained-glass window to commemorate his late mother, Emily Robinson (died 14 July 1906) who had bequeathed the sum of £17,680 to her son (equivalent to £1,780,000 in 2023). This window, which depicts the Good Shepherd with Saint Peter and Saint Paul was added to the north-side of the chancel at St. Andrew's Church in Ipplepen, directly opposite the memorial window, which Emily had dedicated to her husband, Joseph (died 11 August 1903). After his death, Robinson's name was added to the inscription on the window, which commemorates his mother as follows:

To the glory of God and in ever loving
memory of Emily Robinson, who entered
into rest xivth July mcmvi aged lxvii years;
this window is the gift of her son
Bertram Fletcher Robinson who only
survived her six months.

On 16 February 1907, Bertram Fletcher Robinson's estate was proved at £35,949 (equivalent to £3,580,000 in 2023) and his life-long friend and solicitor, Harold Michelmore was granted probate. Robinson left £2,000 each to Michelmore and several cousins. He also bequeathed £2,000 in-trust to Newton College (previously called 'Newton Abbot Proprietary College') for a 'Fletcher Robinson Modern Languages Scholarship' and £1,000 in-trust to Newton Abbot Hospital for a 'Fletcher Robinson Bed'. Robinson's wife, Gladys was named as the principal beneficiary and she inherited the remaining balance of his estate.

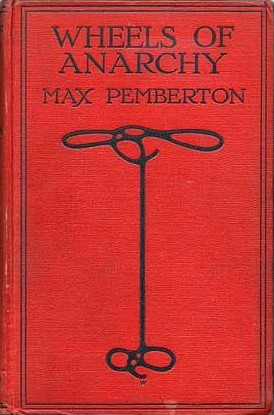
Book cover of Wheels of Anarchy by Max Pemberton (1908)

In January 1908, just one year after Robinson's death, his former editor, friend and fellow Crimes Club member, the popular English novelist, Max Pemberton had a story published by Cassell (publisher), which is titled, Wheels of Anarchy: The Story of an Assassin as Recited from the Papers and the Personal Narrative of His Secretary Mr. Bruce Ingersoll. This book includes the following book dedication in the form of an 'Author's Note':

This story was suggested to me by the late B. Fletcher Robinson,
deeply mourned. The subject was one in which he had interested himself for
some years; and almost the last message I had from him expressed the desire
that I would keep my promise and treat of the idea in a book. This I have now
done, adding something of my own to the brief notes he left me, but chiefly
bringing to the task an enduring gratitude for a friendship which nothing can
replace.

Wheels of Anarchy is an adventure tale about anarchists and assassins, which is set across Continental Europe. The novel's hero and narrator 'Bruce Driscoll', is like Robinson, a graduate of Jesus College, Cambridge and appears to be modelled upon him. In December 2010, Wheels of Anarchy by Max Pemberton was compiled, introduced and republished in facsimile form by Paul Spiring and Hugh Cooke.

During 1909, Gladys Robinson sold both Park Hill House and 44 Eaton Terrace and she then appears to have moved to France. During World War I, Gladys met Major William John Frederick Halliday (Distinguished Service Order), a Royal Artillery officer born in London in 1882 and affectionately referred to as "Fred". The couple got married at the British Diplomatic mission in Paris on 7 January 1918 and thereafter, they relocated to Henley-on-Thames in Oxfordshire. Gladys died in Henley on 8 January 1946 aged 66 years having never had children.

In October 1912, Sir Arthur Conan Doyle's novel The Lost World was published by Hodder & Stoughton. This story is narrated by a character named 'Edward Dunn Malone'. It is possible that Malone is modelled upon Robinson because like Robinson, Malone was raised in the West Country, exceeded six feet in height, became an accomplished amateur rugby union player, worked as a London-based journalist, and he loved a woman called Gladys.

On 3 April 1923, just six weeks after Howard Carter unsealed the burial chamber in the tomb of Tutankhamun, Sir Arthur Conan Doyle arrived in New York to begin a four-month lecture tour on Spiritualism. Two days later he was asked by a reporter whether he connected the breaking news of Lord Carnarvon's death with the curse of the pharaohs. Doyle responded to this question by drawing parallels between the deaths of Robinson and Carnarvon, and his comments were reported in an article, which appeared in the Daily Express newspaper on 7 April 1923, as follows:

It is impossible to say with absolute certainty if this is true…If we had proper occult powers we could determine it, but I warned Mr Robinson against concerning himself with the mummy at the British Museum. He persisted, and his death occurred…I told him he was tempting fate by pursuing his enquiries...The immediate cause of death was typhoid fever, but that is the way in which the elementals guarding the mummy might act. They could have guided Mr Robinson into a series of such circumstances as would lead him to contract the disease, and thus cause his death – just as in Lord Carnarvon's case, human illness was the primary cause of death.

During 1998, both Robinson's collaboration with Sir John Malcolm Fraser, which is titled, The Trail of the Dead and his most notable work, The Chronicles of Addington Peace, were republished as a single volume by the Battered Silicon Dispatch Box (Ontario, Canada). This book features an introduction to the stories, which was written by the noted American author, editor and publisher, Peter Ruber.

On 5 June 2008, Robinson's story The Terror in the Snow was republished in a compendium of short stories titled The Werewolf Pack, which was edited by Mark Valentine (Wordsworth Editions Ltd., Hertfordshire). This story was the second tale in Robinson's 1905 book titled The Chronicles of Addington Peace.

In September 2008, Brian Pugh and Paul Spiring published a biography about Bertram Fletcher Robinson, which is titled Bertram Fletcher Robinson: A Footnote to The Hound of the Baskervilles. This book includes an extensive and factual account of the circumstances, which surrounded the literary collaboration between Arthur Conan Doyle and Robinson, over the novel of the same name.

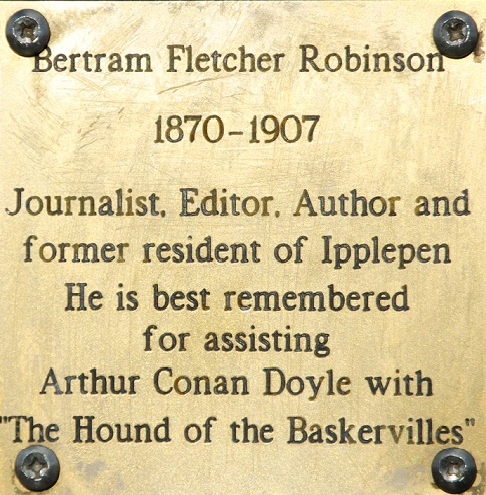
A commemorative plaque sited at Caunters Close in Ipplepen

During January 2009, Ipplepen Parish Council gave permission for a commemorative plaque and bench to be situated outside Caunters Close in Ipplepen. Later that same year, Paul Spiring had a book published, which is titled The World of Vanity Fair by Bertram Fletcher Robinson. This book features nearly two hundred items of chromolithography that were originally published in Vanity Fair and were created by artists including Leslie Ward and Carlo Pellegrini (caricaturist). Spiring's book is a facsimile of 15 articles that Robinson wrote for The Windsor Magazine, under the title of Chronicles in Cartoon, while he was the editor of Vanity Fair (1904–1906). In these articles, Robinson reviews the most prominent caricatures, which appeared in Vanity Fair between 1868 and 1907, and collectively they offer an insight into high society during the mid to late Victorian era.

In February 2010, Robinson's first book, Rugby Football was compiled and republished in facsimile form by Paul Spiring. This book includes a comprehensive introduction by rugby historians and authors, Hugh Cooke and Patrick Casey. It also features a foreword by the rugby enthusiast, Robinson-family descendent and Chairman of Meade-King, Robinson & Co. Ltd., Anthony Graeme de Bracey Marrs, MBE.

In June 2010, Brian Pugh, Paul Spiring and retired psychiatrist, Doctor Sadru Bhanji (brother of the acclaimed international actor, Sir Ben Kingsley), had a book published, which is titled, Arthur Conan Doyle, Sherlock Holmes and Devon. This book contends that the success of Sherlock Holmes is partly attributable to Bertram Fletcher Robinson and two other former Devon residents called Doctor George Turnavine Budd (medical doctor) and (Sir) George Newnes (Doyle's original publisher).

On 1 September 2011, Short Books Limited released a novel titled The Baskerville Legacy by the respected British journalist, John O'Connell. This book presents a highly fictionalised account of the circumstances that led Arthur Conan Doyle and Bertram Fletcher Robinson to conceive The Hound of the Baskervilles.

On 8 January 2012, the BBC broadcast The Hounds of Baskerville, which is the second episode of the second series of the multi-award winning, television crime-drama series, Sherlock. This episode is a contemporary adaptation of The Hound of the Baskervilles and it is centred on a fictional Dartmoor-based animal testing facility called 'Baskerville', which is operated by the Ministry of Defence. This same episode also features a character called 'Fletcher', who is played by the actor Stephen Wight and is modelled on Robinson. The second series of Sherlock was written by co-creator Mark Gatiss and directed by Paul McGuigan.
