= Frederick Clifford =

Frederick Clifford, KC (1828–1904) was an English journalist, known also as a barrister and legal writer.

== Life ==
Born Frederick Catt at Gillingham, Kent, on 22 June 1828, he was fifth son of Jesse Catt a Kentish man by his wife Mary Peirce. After private schooling, he started before he was twenty in provincial journalism. In 1852 he settled in London and joined the parliamentary staff of The Times, of which his elder brother George was already a member at this time both he and George renounced the name Catt and adopted Clifford as their surname. This employment he combined with other work. He retained his connection with the provinces by acting as London correspondent of the Sheffield Daily Telegraph, a conservative journal, and in 1863 he became joint proprietor of the paper with William Christopher Leng.

In the 1851 Census, he is still listed as Frederick Catt, Editor of the Eastern Counties Herald, whilst living as a lodger in Hull.

In 1866 Clifford went to Jamaica to report for The Times the royal commission of inquiry into the conduct of Governor Edward John Eyre. He helped in 1868 to found the Press Association, an institution formed to supply newspaper proprietors of London and the provinces with home and foreign news, and he acted as chairman of the committee of management during two periods of five years each, finally retiring in 1880. In 1877, with the failing health of the editor, John Thadeus Delane, Clifford was transferred by The Times from the reporters' gallery of the House of Commons to Printing House Square; and he acted as assistant editor until his own bad health caused him to resign in 1883.

In parallel, Clifford had made a position as a legal writer. He was admitted to the Middle Temple on 3 November 1856, and was called to the bar on 10 June 1859. Clifford's Practice brought him work at the parliamentary bar. He took silk in 1894, and was elected a bencher of his inn on 18 May 1900.

Clifford was a student of agricultural questions also, and a member of the Royal Botanic Society. He died at his residence, 24 Collingham Gardens, Earl's Court, on 30 December 1904. His library formed a three days' sale at Sotheby's (5–7 May 1905). He was a collector of fans and other works of art.

== Guild of Literature and Art ==
Guild of Literature and Art Act 1854
- Act of Parliament
- Parliament of the United Kingdom
- Long title: An Act to incorporate the Guild of Literature and Art, and to enable it to hold Land.
- Citation: 17 & 18 Vict. c. liv

Dates
- Royal assent: 2 June 1854

Other legislation
- Repealed by: Guild of Literature and Art (Dissolution) Act 1897

Status: Repealed

Text of statute as originally enacted

Guild of Literature and Art (Dissolution) Act 1897
- Act of Parliament
- Parliament of the United Kingdom
- Long title: An Act to provide for the winding up and dissolution of the Guild of Literature and Art and for other purposes.
- Citation: 60 & 61 Vict. c. xciii

Dates
- Royal assent: 15 July 1897

Other legislation
- Repeals/revokes: Guild of Literature and Art Act 1854

Text of statute as originally enacted

In early life Clifford co-operated with Edward Bulwer, Charles Dickens, and other men of letters and artists in forming the Guild of Literature and Art, which was incorporated by the Guild of Literature and Art Act 1854 (17 & 18 Vict. c. liv) in 1854. Clifford was a member of the council. The guild failed in its purposes, and Clifford and Sir John Richard Robinson, the last surviving members of the council, wound up its affairs in 1897 by means of the Guild of Literature and Art (Dissolution) Act 1897 (60 & 61 Vict. c. xciii), drafted by Clifford. They distributed the Funds and landed property (at Knebworth) between the Royal Literary Fund and the Artists' General Benevolent Institution.

== Works ==
In 1870 Clifford, with his lifelong friend, Pembroke S. Stephens, K.C., published The Practice of the Court of Referees on Private Bills in Parliament. This textbook on private bill practice first embodied alterations in the procedure of the Court of Referees made by act of parliament (30 & 31 Vict. c. 136) and by standing orders of the House of Commons in 1867, and it contained the decisions as to the locus standi of petitioners during the sessions 1867-9. Clifford continued to act as joint editor of the Locus Standi Reports to the end of the session of 1884. The historical aspect of the practice especially interested him, and he published later The History of Private Bill Legislation (2 vols. 1885-1887). He wrote also:

- The Steamboat Powers of Railway Companies (1865);
- The Agricultural Lockout of 1874, with notes upon Farming and Farm Labour in the Eastern Counties (1875), based on letters in The Times; and
- a short treatise on the Agricultural Holdings Act, 1875, reprinted from the Royal Agricultural Society's Journal, 1876.

== Family ==
Clifford married in 1853 Caroline, third daughter of Thomas Mason of Hull; she died in 1900. His surviving family of four sons and two daughters presented in his memory a silver-gilt claret jug to the Middle Temple.

His second son, Philip Henry Clifford (1856–1895), graduated B.A. in 1878 from Christ's College, Cambridge, and proceeded M.A. in 1881. He was also a barrister, and writer for The Times.

His fourth son, Colonel Sir Charles Clifford, KBE, CMG, LLD, JP (1860-1936).

== Notes ==
Attribution

This article incorporates text from a publication now in the public domain: Lee, Sidney, ed. (1912). "Clifford, Frederick". Dictionary of National Biography (2nd supplement). Vol. 1. London: Smith, Elder & Co.
