= A. M. Burrage =

British writer

Alfred McLelland Burrage (1889–1956) was a British writer. He was noted in his time as an author of fiction for boys which he published under the pseudonym Frank Lelland, including a popular series called "Tufty". After his death, however, Burrage became best known for his ghost stories.

== Life and work ==
Burrage was born in Hillingdon, London, in 1889. His father, Alfred Sherrington Burrage, and his uncle, Edwin Harcourt Burrage, were both prolific writers of magazine stories for boys. Burrage attended St Augustine's Abbey School in Ramsgate. After his father died in 1906, A. M. Burrage began writing fiction, partly to support his family. Burrage's main market for his fiction were British pulp magazines, such as The Grand Magazine, The Novel Magazine, Cassell's Magazine and The Weekly Tale-Teller.

He served in the Artists’ Rifles in the First World War. Burrage's publisher, Victor Gollancz Ltd., later published a memoir of his war experiences, War Is War, as by "Ex-Private X". War Is War received several good reviews, although it did not sell as well as Gollancz had hoped it would.

For children, Burrage wrote a humorous novel, Poor Dear Esme (1925), about a boy who disguises himself as a girl and attends a girls' school. Poor Dear Esme, which has been described by Jack Adrian as a "comic classic", was often reprinted. Burrage also wrote historical and romance fiction. Burrage's historical fiction was often set in seventeenth-century England, as in the 1936 story "Mr. Codesby's Behaviour".

Burrage is now remembered mainly for his horror fiction, some of which was originally collected in the books Some Ghost Stories (1927) and Someone in the Room (1931, as by "Ex-Private X"), and much of which has been reprinted by Ash-Tree Press.

Burrage was a lapsed Roman Catholic. He died at Edgware General Hospital at the age of sixty-seven on 18 December 1956.

== Critical reception ==
M. R. James praised Burrage's book Some Ghost Stories, saying that the book "keeps on the right side of the line and, if about half his ghosts are amiable, the rest have their terrors, and no mean ones". James later included Burrage among a list of contemporary writers who had "best realized" the possibilities of the ghost story.

E. F. Bleiler has described Burrage's work thus: "The best stories in Some Ghost Stories and Someone in the Room are intelligent, well crafted and imaginative." Richard Dalby has ranked Burrage as "one of the finest English ghost story writers, alongside Benson, Wakefield and James". Neil Barron has stated, "Burrage's underrated short stories are deft and subtle, and include a number of poignant posthumous fantasies."

== Selected works ==
=== Memoir ===
- War Is War (1930)

=== Novels ===
- The St. Austin's Mystery: A Rattling School Story (1908)
- The Cad of the College (1921)
- The Golden Barrier (1925)
- Poor Dear Esme (1925)

=== Collections ===
- Some Ghost Stories (1927)
- Someone in the Room (1931)
- Seeker to the Dead (1942)
- Don't Break the Seal (1946)
- Between the Minute and the Hour (1967)
- Intruders: New Weird Tales (1995): "Wine of Summer", "The Bargain", "Portrait of an Unknown Lady", "Top Floor Back", "'Orders from Brigade'", "The Intruder", "By the Looe River", "The Man on the Corner", "The Pace Maker", "Footprints", "The Spanish Captain", "Passenger on the Eleven-Ten", "In the Waters Under the Earth", "The Lady of Graeme", "The Box in the Attic", "The Caricature", "The Sisters of Changton Margery", "The Breaking of the Spell", "The Lovers", "House o' Dreams", "The Chalk Pit", "The Lady of the Chateau", "Miss Jessica", "The Last of the Kerstons", "Corner Cottage", "Fellow Mortals"
- Warning Whispers (expanded edition, 1999): "The Acquittal", "The Frontier of Dreams", "Warning Whispers", "Crookback", "For the Local Rag", "The Wind in the Attic", "The Little Blue Flames", "In the Courtyard", "The Recurring Tragedy", "The Case of Thissler and Baxter", "The Green Bungalow", "The Attic", "The Witch of Oxshott", "Fellow Travellers", "The Ticking of the Clock", "The Imperturbable Tucker", "The Boy with Red Hair", "The Garden of Fancy", "The Mystery of the Sealed Garret", "At the Toy Menders", "The Kiss of Hesper", "For One Night Only", "Father of the Man", "The Fourth Wall", "I'm Sure It Was No. 31"

== Critical studies ==
- Jack Adrian, "Burrage, A(lfred) M(cLelland)" in David Pringle, St. James Guide to Horror, Ghost and Gothic Writers. London: St. James Press, 1998, ISBN 1558622063
- S. T. Joshi, "A. M. Burrage:The Ghost Man" in Classics and Contemporaries (2009).
