= Unlucky Mummy =

Ancient Egyptian artifact in the collection of the British Museum

Coordinates: 51.5197°N 0.1278°W

The Unlucky Mummy
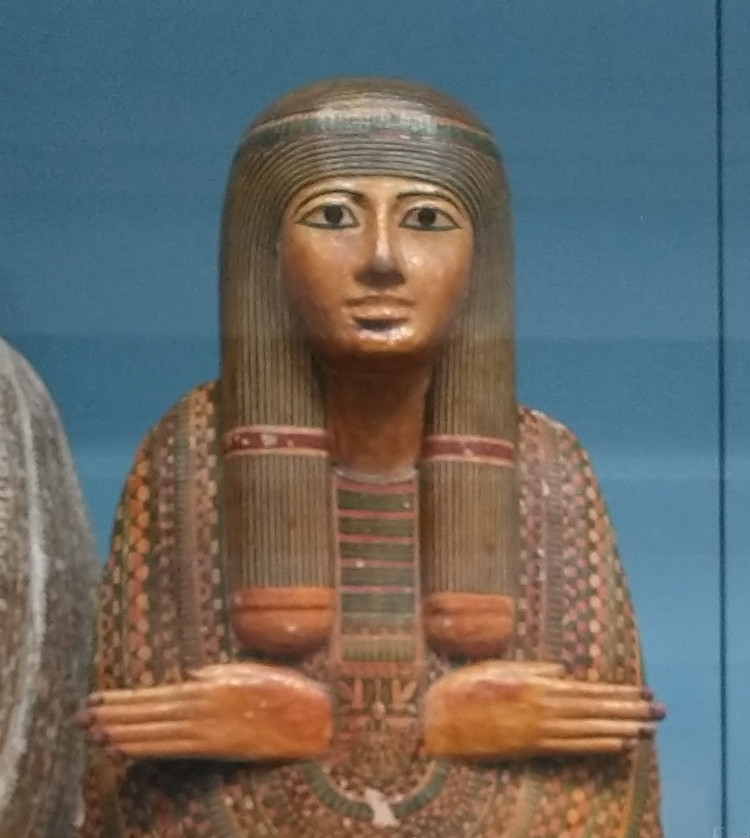
- The mummy board on display in the British Museum in 2022
- Material: Wood, plaster
- Size: Length: 162 cm (64 in)
- Created: 950BC (c.)
- Period/culture: 21st Dynasty
- Place: Thebes (?)
- Present location: Room 62, British Museum, London
- Identification: 22542
- Registration: 1889,0731.1

The Unlucky Mummy is an Ancient Egyptian artifact in the collection of the British Museum in London. The identity of the original owner is unknown. This "painted wooden mummy-board of an unidentified woman" was acquired by the British Museum in 1889.

The mummy-board has acquired a reputation for bringing misfortune, and many myths have developed around it.

== Overview ==
The name 'Unlucky Mummy' is misleading as the artifact is not a mummy at all, but rather a gessoed and painted wooden 'mummy-board' or inner coffin lid. It was found at Thebes and can be dated by its shape and the style of its decoration to the late 21st or early 22nd Dynasty (c 950–900 BC). In the British Museum it is known by its serial number EA 22542.

The beardless face and the position of the hands with fingers extended show that it was made to cover the mummified body of a woman. Her identity is not known due to the brief hieroglyphic inscriptions containing only short religious phrases, and omitting mention of the name of the deceased. The high quality of the lid indicates that the owner was a person of high rank. It was usual for such ladies to participate in the musical accompaniments to the rituals in the temple of Amen-ra; hence early British Museum publications described the owner of 22542 as a 'priestess of Amen-Ra'. E.A. Wallis Budge, Keeper of Egyptian and Assyrian Antiquities from 1894 to 1924, also suggested that she might have been of royal blood, but this was pure speculation and is not supported by the iconography of the lid.

=== Physical attributes ===
The mummy-board is 162 centimetres (64 in) in length and made out of wood and plaster. The detail is painted upon the plaster, and hands protrude from the wooden mummy-board. For its age, the mummy-board is of good quality.

=== Exhibition history ===
The mummy-board was donated to the British Museum in July 1889 by Mrs Warwick Hunt of Holland Park, London, on behalf of Mr Arthur F Wheeler. It was displayed in the 'First Egyptian Room' of the Museum from the 1890s and has remained on public view ever since, with the exception of periods during the First and Second World Wars, when it was removed from its case for safety. It has left the Museum on a number of occasions, in 1990, when it formed part of a temporary exhibition held at two venues in Australia and between 4 February to 27 May 2007 along with 271 pieces the 'Unlucky Mummy' was exhibited at Taiwan's National Palace Museum during a press conference. The mummy to which the article belonged is said to have been left in Egypt since it never formed part of the collections of the British Museum. The mummy board is currently displayed in Room 62.

== Unlucky myths ==
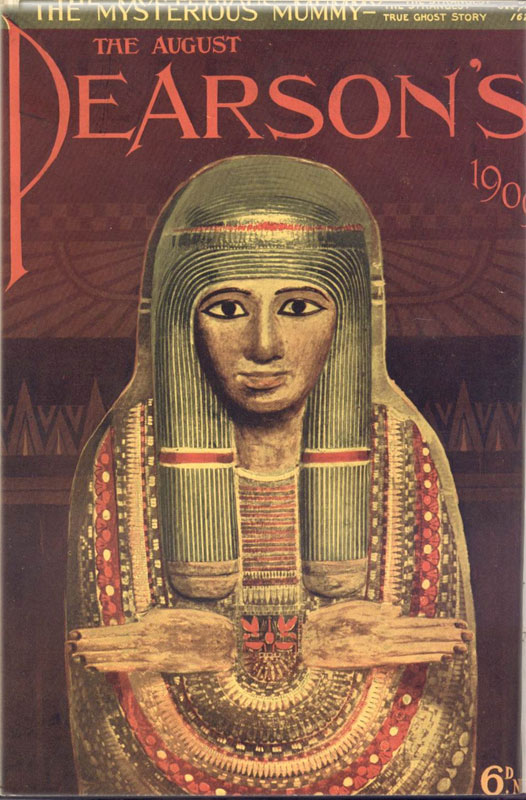
Cover of Pearson's Magazine in 1909 depicting the mummy

The mummy-board has acquired a reputation for bringing misfortune, and many myths have developed around it. It has been credited with causing death, injury and large-scale disasters, with one story ending by saying that the "mummy" was being moved from the British Museum to New York on the RMS Titanic when it sank. None of these stories have any basis in fact, but from time to time the strength of the rumours has led to enquiries on the subject. A disclaimer written by Wallis Budge was published in 1934, and yet since that time the myth has undergone further embellishment.

The Unlucky Mummy has also been linked to the death of the British writer and journalist, Bertram Fletcher Robinson. Robinson conducted research into the history of that artefact while working as a journalist for the Daily Express newspaper during 1904. He became convinced that the object had malevolent powers and died three years later, aged 36.

On 3 April 1923, just six weeks after Howard Carter unsealed the burial chamber in the tomb of Tutankhamun, Sir Arthur Conan Doyle arrived in New York to begin a four-month lecture tour on Spiritualism. Two days later he was asked by a reporter whether he connected the breaking news of Lord Carnarvon’s death with the curse of the pharaohs. Doyle responded to this question by drawing parallels between the deaths of Robinson and Carnarvon, and his comments were reported in an article, which appeared in the Daily Express newspaper on 7 April 1923, as follows:

It is impossible to say with absolute certainty if this is true…If we had proper occult powers we could determine it, but I warned Mr Robinson against concerning himself with the mummy at the British Museum. He persisted, and his death occurred…I told him he was tempting fate by pursuing his enquiries...The immediate cause of death was typhoid fever, but that is the way in which the elementals guarding the mummy might act. They could have guided Mr Robinson into a series of such circumstances as would lead him to contract the disease, and thus cause his death – just as in Lord Carnarvon's case, human illness was the primary cause of death.

== In popular culture ==
The mummy briefly appears in From Hell (1999), the graphic novel by Alan Moore, in a scene where the antagonist, the royal physician Sir William Gull, visits it. In the appendix, Moore describes the artifact as one of the most famous “cursed” mummy cases, writing: “One of the great famous 'cursed' mummy cases of all time, a scarcely credible trail of death, illness and bereavement seemed to follow the various owners of this artifact as they hurriedly passed on the mummy through the auction houses of London, where we see an interested Dr Gull viewing it here.”
