= Barbara MacGahan =

Russian-American journalist and novelist

Barbra MacGahan
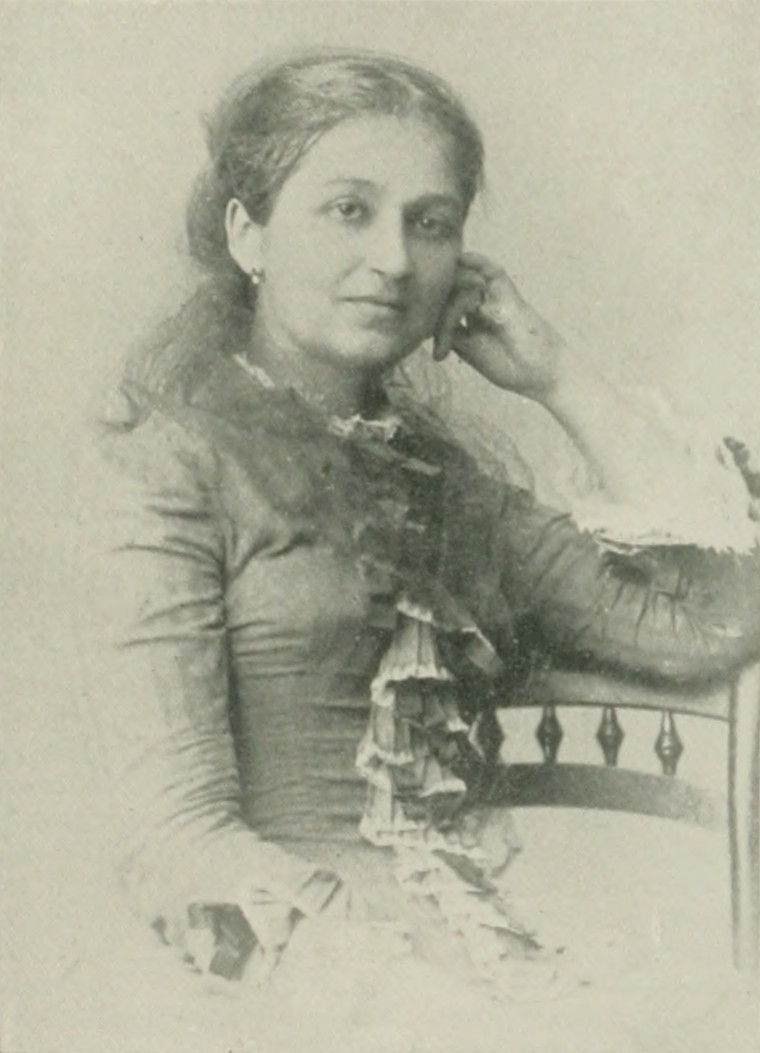
- Barbra MacGahan
- Born: Varvara Nikolaevna Elagina; April 14, 1850; Tula, Russia
- Died: February 28, 1904 (aged 53); New York City, U.S.
- Occupations: Novelist, writer, journalist
- Spouse: Januarius MacGahan (m. 1873; died 1878)
- Writing career
- Pen name: Pavel Kashirin
- Notable work: Xenia Repnina

Barbra MacGahan (born Varvara Nikolaevna Elagina; April 14, 1850 – February 28, 1904) was an American journalist and novelist born in Tula, Russian Empire. She was known for writing her first novel in Russian under a fictitious name, Pavel Kashirin, and under another English pen name for her novel Xenia Repnina.

She was a writer for The New York Times, the Russian Golos, New York Herald, and many other American and Russian newspapers and magazines.

== Early life ==
MacGahan was born on April 14, 1850, in Tula under the Tula Governorate in the Russian Empire as Varvara Nikolaevna Elagina. Her father, Nikolay Pavlovich Elagin (1801–1863) came from an ancient family of Tula landowners and nobles. She was homeschooled by scholars and tutors and then placed into the girl's gymnasium in Tula. At that establishment she was influenced by teachers and directors, some of whom were collaborators of Count Tolstoi in his school work in paper in America until the Russian "Golos".

In 1866 she graduated from The Tula Female Seminary and led a well-to-do life. In 1871 she met her future husband, the New York Herald war correspondent reporter Januarius MacGahan on a trip to the Crimea.

Two years later, in January 1873, they got married in France and she moved with her husband to Lyons, to Spain (1874–1875) with the Carlist Army during the Spanish War, to England, France, the Russian Empire, the Ottoman Empire and later moving to Romania where she stayed throughout the Russo-Turkish War. She was also accompanied by her three-year-old son Paul MacGahan.

== Career ==
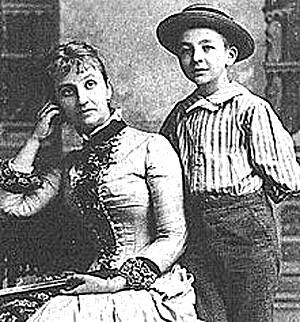
Barbara with her son, Paul MacGahan

Her career began helping her husband with his writing, translating and transcribing during their travels around the world while she accompanied him during the Spanish–American War and the Russian-Turkish War. During the Carlist War she wrote newsletters under her husband's name which were published in St. Petersburg's Golos Truda, a liberal newspaper This is known as one of the famous newspapers in the working class that allows people to learn about the Russian life and is a space which allows public opinion and social integration. After that she set off on her own journalistic pathway to the beginning of her career.

After her husband's death she worked for the "Golos" for two years in their editorial rooms while writing articles for Russian periodicals, letters from St. Petersburg's for the New York "Herald" and was a corresponding reporter for the Sidney "Herald", Australia at the same time.

In 1880, she was sent to the United States to cover and observe the presidential campaign during the year. In 1883 she returned to Russia during the coronation of Alexander III where she wrote newsletters from Russia to New York for The New York Times and Brooklyn Eagle. Her journey as a journalist continued to grow as she began to write for "Novosti" of St. Petersburg and "Russkiye Viedomosti" of Moscow, the two leading liberal newspapers in Russia. She later moved permanently to the United States however, she kept her correspondence with these papers even then.

In 1882 she became a journalist for "Messenger of Europe" a leading magazine in Russia. In 1890 she became she wrote many regular monthly publications on American life for a St. Petersburg magazine Northern Messenger. She also wrote fiction stories in the Messenger of Europe under the pen name "Paul Kashirine". She contributed articles to a variety of American newspapers and magazines such as the American Press Association, Youth's Companion, and Lippincott's Magazine.

In 1890 her novel Xenia Repnina was published in English by Routledge in New York City and London.

Her last visit to Russia was in 1903. She died in New York on February 28, 1904.

== See also ==
- Epiphany Monastery
- New York Herald Tribune
- The Boston Globe
- Leo Tolstoy
