= Edwin Pears =

British historian (1835–1919)

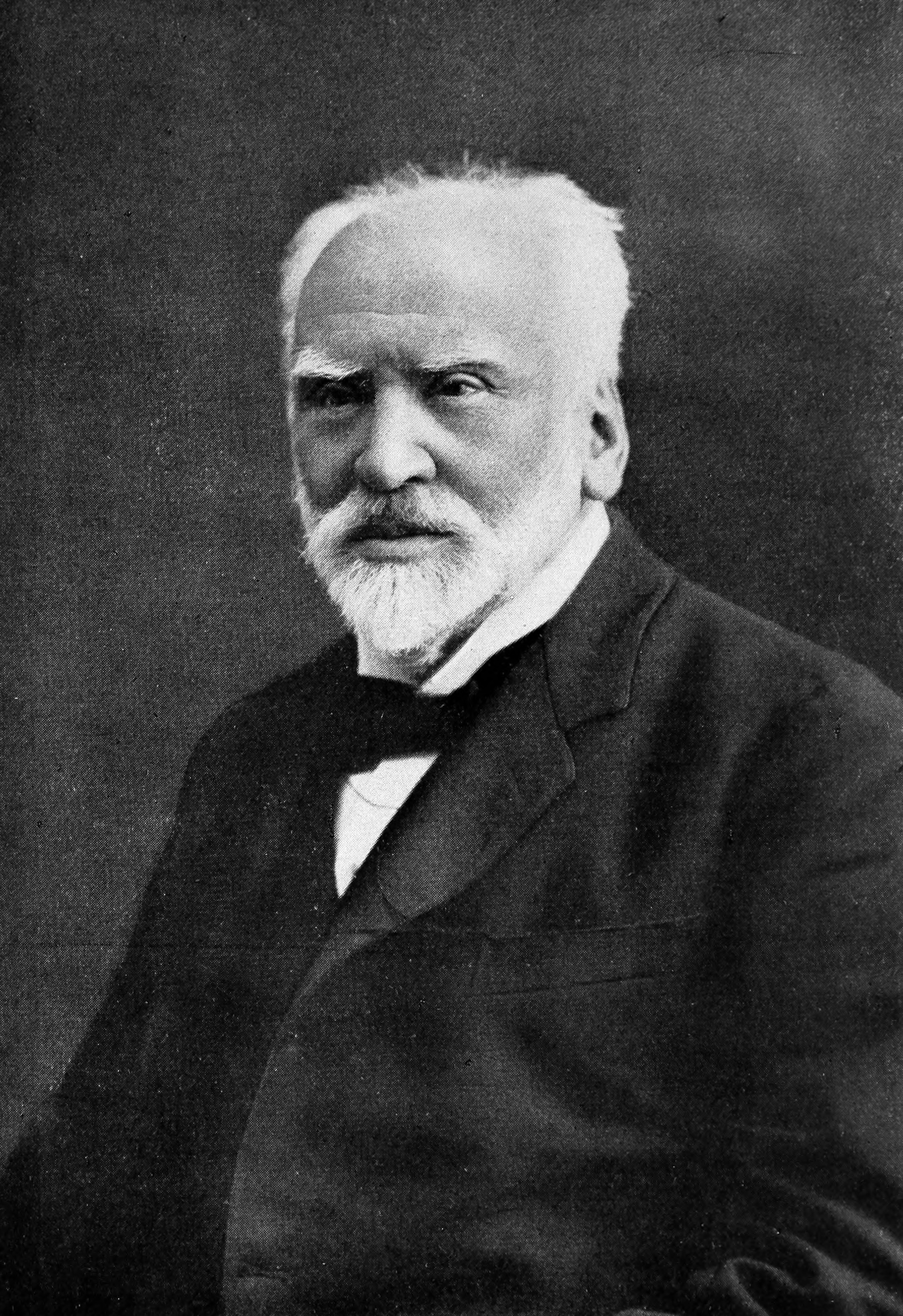
- Sir Edwin Pears (1915)
- Born: 18 March 1835; York, England
- Died: 27 November 1919 (aged 84); Malta
- Resting place: Ta' Braxia Cemetery; 35°53′24.7″N 014°29′54.3″E
- Education: University of London
- Occupations: barrister; historian
- Known for: Turkey and Its People (1 ed.). London: Methuen & Co. Ltd. 1911.

Sir Edwin Pears (18 March 1835 – 27 November 1919) was a British barrister, author and historian. He lived in Constantinople (now Istanbul) for about forty years and he is known for his 1911 book Turkey and its People.

== Early life ==
Pears was born on 18 March 1835 in York, England. He was educated privately and at the University of London where he took first-class honours in Roman law and jurisprudence.

Pears was called to the Bar at Middle Temple in 1870. He was also private secretary to Frederick Temple, then Bishop of Exeter, and later Archbishop of Canterbury. Pears was also secretary to various associations connected with social work in London.

== Constantinople ==
Pears settled in Constantinople in 1873. He practised in the consular courts and became president of the European bar there. He rose to become one of the leaders of the British colony in Constantinople.

Pears travelled much through Turkish dominions, and studied Turkish history from both the Turkish and foreign perspectives.

In this way, Pears acquired an intimate knowledge of Turkey. In 1876, as correspondent of The Daily News, he sent letters home describing Ottoman atrocities and the April Uprising in Bulgaria. The letters aroused popular demonstrations in England led by William Ewart Gladstone. At the time, the reports of these atrocities were generally disbelieved and Pears' letters placed all the incontrovertible facts before the English people.

In 1909, Pears was knighted, returning to London to receive the honour in person on 22 July 1909.

In 1911, Pears wrote the book Turkey and its People. It is regarded as his most distinguished book. In that book, he displayed his expert knowledge of Byzantine Constantinople. The book contains original material on the nationalities of the Ottoman Empire. The book was an attempt to interpret Turkey to the western people.

In 1916, Pears wrote Forty Years in Constantinople. This book is regarded as essential reading for the study of the Ottoman constitutional revolution of 1908.

== Death ==
Pears died on 27 November 1919 in Malta from an accident on his journey home from Constantinople.

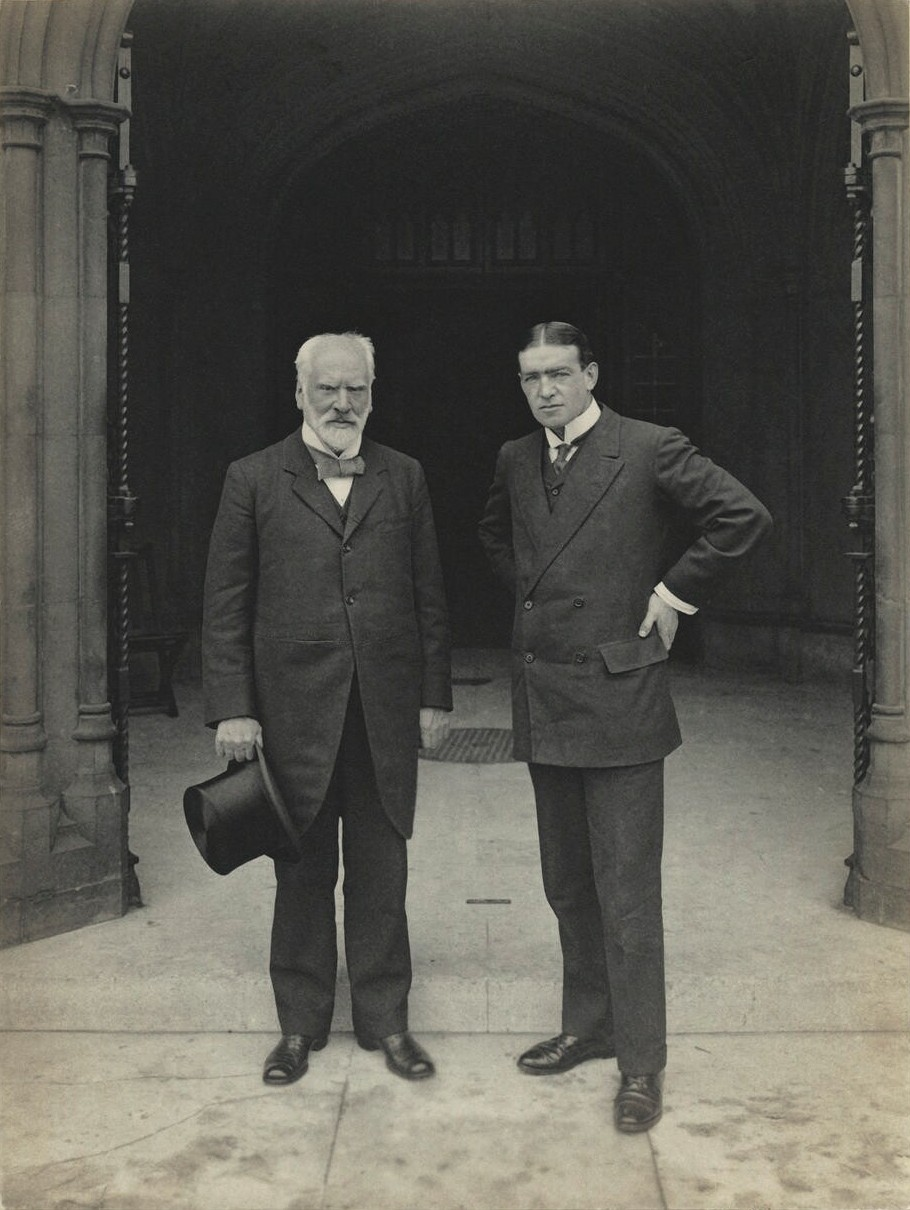
Sir Edwin Pears and Ernest Henry Shackleton (29 June 1909)

== Awards and decorations ==
- Knight Bachelor (1909)
- Commander of the Order of Merit of Bulgaria
- Knight of the Order of the Saviour of Greece

== Books ==
- The Fall of Constantinople: Being the Story of the Fourth Crusade. Logmans, Green, and Sons. 1885 – via Google Books.
- The Destruction of the Greek Empire and the Story of the Capture of Constantinople (1 ed.). London: Longmans, Green & Co. 1903 – via Internet Archive.
- Turkey And Its People. London: Methuen & Co. Ltd. 1911 – via Internet Archive.
- Forty Years in Constantinople: The Recollections of Sir Edwin Pears, 1873–1915. London: Herbert Jenkins Limited. 1916 – via Internet Archive.
- The Life Of Abdul Hamid. London: Constable and Company Ltd. 1917 – via Internet Archive.

== Articles ==
- Pollock, Frederick, ed. (1905). "Turkish Capitulations and the Status of British and Other Foreign Subjects Residing in Turkey". The Law Quarterly Review. XXI. London: Stevens & Sons: 408-425 – via Internet Archive.

== See also ==
- Eugene Schuyler
- Januarius MacGahan
