= Will Seymour Monroe =

Will Seymour Monroe (1863 Hunlock, Pennsylvania – 1939) was a United States educator.

== Biography ==
He attended Stanford University, and studied at the Jena, Paris, and Leipzig universities, becoming in 1896 professor of psychology at the Massachusetts Normal School, Westfield. After 1909, he taught at the New Jersey State Normal School, Montclair. He lectured before many universities in the United States and abroad, and was delegate to many congresses and expositions.

== Works ==
- Poets and Poetry of the Wyoming Valley (1887)
- The Educational Labors of Henry Barnard (1893)
- Comenius' School of Infancy (1896)
- Educational Museums and Libraries of Europe (1896)
- Bibliography of Henry Barnard (1897)
- Bibliography of Education (1897)
- Status of Child Study in Europe (1899)
- Comenius and the Beginnings of Educational Reform (1900)
- Turkey and the Turks (1907)
- In Viking Land; Norway: Its Peoples, Fjords and its Fjelds (1908); later The Spell of Norway (1923)
- Sicily, the Garden of the Mediterranean (1909); later The Spell of Sicily (1922)
- Bohemia and the Cechs (1910); later The Spell of Bohemia (1929)
- Bulgaria and her People (1914)
