= F. Lauriston Bullard =

American journalist

- Born: May 13, 1866; Wauseon, Ohio, USA
- Died: August 3, 1952 (aged 86)
- Education: College of Wooster (BA, 1891; MA, 1894); Yale University (PhD, 1903)
- Known for: Pulitzer Prize for Editorial Writing (1927)
- Spouse: Clara Elizabeth Keil

Frederic Lauriston Bullard (May 13, 1866 – August 3, 1952) was an American Christian minister and later an editorialist who won the 1927 Pulitzer Prize for Editorial Writing for his work in the Boston Herald entitled "We Submit", which argued for a retrial in the Sacco and Vanzetti case. He also wrote several books regarding Abraham Lincoln.
