= Crowe (surname) =

Crowe is a surname of Middle English origin. Its Old English origin means 'crow', and was a nickname for someone said to resemble this bird, probably if they had very dark hair. The name is historically most common in the English Counties of Norfolk and Suffolk particularly around the City of Norwich. The name may alternatively have an Irish origin: in Ireland, it may originate as an anglicisation of Mac Enchroe a clan of munster while in the Isle of Man it represents an anglicised version of Mc Crawe (1540).

People with this name include:

- A. G. Crowe (born 1948), Louisiana politician
- Alan Crowe (born 1940), Isle of Man politician
- Alex Crowe (1924–1997), Scottish footballer with St Mirren and Ipswich Town
- Allen Crowe (1928–1963), American racecar driver
- Allison Crowe (born 1981), Canadian singer/songwriter
- Amanda Crowe (1928–2004), Cherokee woodcarver and educator
- Amee-Leigh Murphy Crowe (born 1995), Irish rugby sevens and union player
- Bob Crowe (born 1936), Australian rules footballer
- Brian Crowe (1938–2020) British diplomat, Ambassador to Austria 1989–1992
- Cameron Crowe (born 1957), American screenwriter and film director
- Carl Crowe (born 1975), English cricketer
- Cathal Crowe (born 1982), Irish politician
- Catherine Crowe (1790–1872), English novelist, story writer and playwright
- Cathy Crowe (born 1952), Canadian nurse, educator and social activist
- Charlie Crowe (1924–2010), English footballer with Newcastle United
- Charles Crowe (1867–1953), Canadian sport shooter
- Christopher or Chris Crowe (disambiguation), several people
- Clem Crowe (1903–1983), American football and basketball player
- Sir Colin Crowe (1913–1989), British diplomat
- Craig Crowe (born 1979), English cricketer
- Curtis Crowe, American rock drummer
- Cyril Crowe (1894–1974), British World War I flying ace
- Dave Crowe (1933–2000), New Zealand cricketer
- David Crowe (disambiguation), several people
- Dean Crowe (born 1979), English footballer with Stoke City, Luton Town
- Ellen Crowe (c.1847–1930), Irish-New Zealand community leader
- Ellie Crowe, South African-American author
- Eugene B. Crowe (1878–1970), U.S. Representative from Indiana
- Sir Eyre Crowe (1864–1925), British diplomat
- Eyre Crowe (painter), (1824–1910), English painter
- Eyre Evans Crowe (1799–1868), English journalist and historian, nephew of the above
- Frances Crowe (1919–2019) American peace activist
- Frank Crowe (1882–1946), American civil engineer
- Frank W. Crowe (1919–1987), American physician
- Frederick Crowe (1862–1931), English organist
- George Crowe (disambiguation), several people
- Glen Crowe (born 1977), Irish footballer with Bohemians, Ireland
- Heather Crowe (activist) (1945–2006), Canadian anti-smoking campaigner
- Heather Crowe (tennis), American tennis player
- Henry Crowe (disambiguation), several people
- Imogen Claire (1943–2005), born Crowe, English dancer and actress
- J. D. Crowe (1937–2021), American banjo player and bluegrass band leader
- Jack Crowe (born 1947), American football coach
- Jason Crowe (born 1978), English footballer with Portsmouth, Northampton
- Jason Crowe (basketball) (born 1976), American professional basketball player
- Jeff Crowe (born 1958), former New Zealand cricketer
- Jim Crowe (footballer) (1909–1979), Australian rules footballer
- John Crowe (disambiguation), several people
- Joseph Crowe (disambiguation), several people
- ((Kenneth C Crowe (born 1934) Pulitzer Prize winning Journalist))
- Leo Crowe (1912–1966), American basketball player
- Margaret Cowie Crowe (1882–1973), Scottish nurse who served in Serbia during World War I
- Mark Crowe (footballer) (born 1965), English footballer with Torquay United, Cambridge United
- Martin Crowe (1962–2016), former New Zealand cricketer
- Matt Crowe (1932–2017), Scottish footballer with Partick Thistle, Norwich City
- Michael Crowe (disambiguation), several people
- Morrill Martin Crowe (1901–1994), Richmond, Virginia, pharmacist and politician
- Neville Crowe (1937–2016), former Australian rules footballer
- Nick Crowe (disambiguation), several people
- Ollie Crowe, Irish politician
- Owen Crowe (born 1982), Canadian professional poker player
- Pamela Crowe, Isle of Man politician
- Pat Crowe (1864–1938), aka Frank Roberts, American criminal turned author and lecturer
- Patrick Crowe (1892–1969), Irish Fine Gael politician
- Peggy Crowe (1956–2012), American speed skater
- Phil Crowe (ice hockey) (born 1970), Canadian ice hockey winger
- Ray Crowe (1915–2003), American politician and basketball coach
- Raymond Crowe, Australian mime artist, magician and cabaret performer
- Robert Crowe (cyclist) (born 1968), Australian cyclist
- Robert Crowe (singer), American sopranist and musicologist
- Robert E. Crowe (1879–1958), Chicago lawyer and politician
- Russell Crowe (born 1964), New Zealander Australian actor
- Rusty Crowe (born 1947), Tennessee politician
- Sir Sackville Crowe, 1st Baronet (c.1611–c.1683), English nobleman and politician
- Sanford Johnston Crowe (1868–1931), Canadian politician
- Sara Crowe (born 1966), Scottish actress
- Seán Crowe (born 1957), Irish Sinn Féin politician
- Simon Crowe (born 1955), drummer for Irish band The Boomtown Rats
- Steve Crowe (disambiguation), several people
- Susan Crowe, Canadian folk singer-songwriter
- Suzanne Crowe, Irish anaesthesiologist
- Dame Sylvia Crowe (1901–1997), English landscape architect
- Tom Crowe (1922–2010), BBC radio announcer
- Tom Crowe (footballer) (1880–1914), Australian rules footballer
- Tonya Crowe (born 1971), American actress
- Trevor Crowe (born 1983), American Major League baseball player
- Trisha Crowe, Australian soprano
- Vic Crowe (1932–2009), Welsh footballer with Aston Villa, Wales
- William Crowe (disambiguation), several people

== See also ==
- Crow (surname)
