= Radical Club (London) =

19th-century London political salon

- Formation: 1870
- Founder: Henry Fawcett
- Founded at: London
- Dissolved: early 1880s
- Type: Private dining and discussion club
- Purpose: Support network and debating forum for Radical members of the Liberal Party and sympathetic writers
- Headquarters: London
- Members: 40 (half Members of Parliament)
- Secretary: Sir Charles Dilke
- Key people: Millicent Fawcett (treasurer); John Stuart Mill

The Radical Club was a London dining and discussion club, founded in 1870, that served as an informal support network and debating forum for the Radical wing of the Liberal Party and for sympathetic men of letters during the later Victorian period. Conceived and led by the blind economist and Liberal MP Henry Fawcett, it gave the dispersed Radical intellectuals of the day both a regular meeting place and a means of coordinating reformist pressure on the Liberal leadership. Its early proceedings were dominated by the figure of John Stuart Mill, and it numbered among its forty members roughly an equal mix of parliamentarians and writers, journalists and academics.

The club exerted its greatest influence in the early 1870s but declined after Mill's death in 1873 and the Liberal electoral defeat of 1874, lapsing into abeyance in the early 1880s as its leading members took ministerial office.

== Origins ==
In the mid-1860s there was as yet no organised Radical party, only a loose grouping of advanced reformers within the Liberal Party who defined themselves against the aristocratic Whig Liberals and the anti-democratic "Adullamite" Liberals. After the Radical gains of the 1865 general election were checked in 1868, Fawcett set about giving this loose formation some structure, building a support network for Radical parliamentarians. The economist John Elliott Cairnes referred to the resulting circle as the "academic liberals," and it was this nucleus that hardened into the more formal Radical Club.

The wider movement had intellectual roots reaching back to the 1850s, when a Radical set gathered around Fawcett and Leslie Stephen at Trinity Hall, Cambridge, taking Mill's Principles of Political Economy, On Liberty and System of Logic as something close to scripture. Many of these Cambridge men—together with Oxford contemporaries—later came down to London to pursue careers in journalism, law and politics, and supplied the membership of a cluster of reform-minded clubs, of which the Radical Club was the most explicitly political.

== Foundation and organisation ==
The club was constituted in 1870 on the principle that membership should not exceed forty, of whom one half were to be Members of Parliament and the other half non-members who could, in the language of the founding rule, "assist the cause of Radicalism by speech or writing." Fawcett was the guiding spirit; Sir Charles Dilke, who had entered Parliament in 1868, served as secretary; and Fawcett's wife, the suffragist Millicent Garrett Fawcett, acted as treasurer.

No premises were taken: administrative work was handled at Fawcett's London house and at Dilke's large Chelsea mansion. The inaugural dinner was held on Tuesday 13 February 1870—reputedly the coldest day then recorded in England. Accounts of the regular meetings differ slightly: Sumanta Niyogi records that each member took a turn hosting a weekly meeting at his own residence, with some, including the Fawcetts, rounding off the evening with a lavish dinner, while Gregory Moore, drawing on the Dilke Papers, describes members dining at various London inns each Sunday that Parliament was in session, to debate a paper bearing on the business of that session.

Given the many shades of opinion within the Victorian Radical spectrum, Fawcett judged it unwise to attempt a written constitution, and the club operated instead on a set of broadly shared aims.

== Aims and objectives ==
While the club drafted no formal programme, its members agreed on a recognisable cluster of objectives that reflected the Philosophical-Radical inheritance of Mill:

- Further extension of the parliamentary franchise.
- Advocacy of non-sectarian national education and the removal of religious tests for university admission.
- Application of the principle of "the career open to talent"—appointment by merit and ability—in the army, the civil service and official employment generally.
- Improvement in the condition of factory workers and agricultural labourers.
- Resistance to the spread of socialism.

This last aim sat in growing tension with the changing temper of the club. Over time its meetings became a battleground between members who wished to confine reform to the political emancipation of the disenfranchised through an assault on aristocratic privilege, and those—increasingly led by Dilke—who, following Mill's later writings, favoured a degree of material emancipation through limited state intervention. Dilke himself recorded that he "gradually deserted Fawcett and, more and more influenced by Mill's later views, finally came to march even in front of Mill in our advance." Mill is thought to have introduced this interventionist note when he used a club meeting to argue that the "unearned increment" of land values should be taxed.

== Activities and influence ==
About half the membership sat in the House of Commons, and the club functioned as a clearing-house of ideas and tactics for Radical legislators. Its proceedings fed directly into the parliamentary careers of its members; Fawcett's campaigns on India and the Empire, university reform, disestablishment, Irish land, and the merit principle in public appointments were all bound up with his work in Radical circles. Several members carried the club's instincts into Parliament in vivid ways—Dilke and Auberon Herbert, for instance, both declared their republicanism in the House of Commons in the early 1870s, Herbert seconding Dilke's 1872 motion on the Civil List and acting as teller with him in the ensuing division.

More broadly, the club helped accelerate the transformation of a still largely Whig-dominated Liberal Party—an ascendancy that had persisted up to the death of Lord Palmerston in 1865—into a party with a pronounced Radical wing. By providing a rallying point for British Radicals, it served to press the Liberal leadership toward Radical objectives during the reforming Parliament of the early 1870s.

== Decline ==
The energy of the early years did not last. Frederic Harrison resigned in 1872, and the death of Mill in 1873 removed the figure whose presence had given the club much of its authority; from the latter half of 1873 the meetings ceased to be regular. The Liberal rout at the 1874 general election dealt a further blow, costing several members their seats. In Dilke's recollection, the club had by then "dropped very much into the hands of Fawcett, Fitzmaurice and myself."

A protracted power struggle between Fawcett and Dilke—the one defending the older, individualist Radicalism of Mill's youth, the other advancing toward collectivism—soured later meetings, while the calibre of the membership thinned: abler members drifted away, less distinguished ones attended more often, and some newcomers were scarcely Radicals at all. The club retained a little influence in the Commons through the late 1870s but lost it entirely in the early 1880s, when Dilke, Fawcett and Joseph Chamberlain, on taking office in Gladstone's second administration, resigned under a club rule barring members from holding ministerial rank. The club is generally regarded as having lapsed by the time of Fawcett's death in 1884.

== Members ==
The club was limited to forty members. Those recorded in the sources include its officers and the following (names are given in their conventional modern forms, with source spellings noted where they differ).

Officers

- Henry Fawcett — Liberal MP and Professor of Political Economy at Cambridge; founder and guiding spirit
- Sir Charles Dilke — Liberal MP; secretary
- Millicent Garrett Fawcett — suffragist leader; treasurer

Members

- John Stuart Mill — philosopher and former MP; early leading figure (d. 1873)
- John Elliott Cairnes — political economist (given as "James Cairnes" by Niyogi)
- Leonard Courtney — MP and Times leader-writer
- John Morley — journalist and editor, later Liberal statesman
- Leslie Stephen — author, critic and editor
- Frederic Harrison — Positivist and barrister (resigned 1872)
- Henry Sidgwick — philosopher (given as "Sidgewick" by Niyogi)
- Thomas Hare — reformer and advocate of proportional representation
- Lord Edmond Fitzmaurice — Liberal MP (given as "Edmund" by Niyogi)
- Frank Harrison Hill — editor of the Daily News
- Auberon Herbert — radical individualist MP for Nottingham (1870–1874), republican, later originator of "voluntaryism"
- William McCullagh Torrens — MP and social reformer
- Sir David Wedderburn — MP and former Indian Civil Service officer
- Sir George Campbell — colonial administrator, later Lieutenant-Governor of Bengal
- A. J. Mundella — Radical MP and education reformer
- Eustace Smith — MP (probably Thomas Eustace Smith, Liberal MP for Tynemouth)
- Joseph Chamberlain — Radical MP (a later member; resigned on taking office c.1880–82)

== Relationship with the Savile Club ==
The Radical Club drew on the same generation of Oxbridge-educated reformers, journalists and men of letters as the Savile Club, founded in mid-1868 as the Eclectic Club, renamed the New Club in 1869 and the Savile Club in 1871. The two were institutionally distinct—the Radical Club a political support network, the Savile an avowedly social and literary society whose motto Sodalitas Convivium signalled conviviality over doctrine—but they shared a common social world.

The historian Christopher Kent has shown that the Savile's early membership included a number of liberals with Radical leanings who also belonged to the allied Century Club, among them George C. Brodrick, Frank Harrison Hill, R. H. Hutton, Godfrey Lushington, Thorold Rogers, A. O. Rutson, James Bryce, Richard Monckton Milnes and Leslie Stephen. The membership rolls printed in the club's jubilee history, The Savile Club, 1868–1923, record several Radical Club members among the Savilians of the club's first decade: Sir Charles Dilke, Leonard Courtney, Leslie Stephen, Henry Sidgwick, Lord Edmond Fitzmaurice, Frank Harrison Hill, A. J. Mundella and Auberon Herbert, the last a member from the Savile's foundation year. Stephen remained a Savile member until 1877, when, in the customary progression of the period, he resigned on election to the Athenaeum.

The overlap reflected the institutional landscape of reformist London in the late 1860s and early 1870s, in which the same group of "clubbable" university Radicals circulated between the explicitly political venues (the Radical Club and the Century), the social and literary Savile, and dining societies such as the Ad Eundem Club.

== See also ==
- Savile Club
- Cosmopolitan Club
- Political Economy Club
- Radicals (UK)
- Henry Fawcett
