= Crowe =

Crowe may refer to:

- Crowe (surname), origin of the name and a list of people
- Crowe baronets, a former baronetcy of England
- Crowe Global, an accounting, consulting, and technology firm from the USA
- Crowe Lake, Peterborough County, Ontario, Canada
- Crowe River, in Canada
- Crowe sign, or Crowe's sign, a medical sign that is used in the diagnosis of neurofibromatosis

== See also ==
- Crow (disambiguation)
- Crow (surname)
- Crowe & Dunlevy, an American law firm
- Crowell (disambiguation)
