= Crow (disambiguation) =

A crow is a bird of the genus Corvus, including ravens and rooks.

Crow, The Crow or Crows may also refer to:

== Places ==
=== United States ===
- Crow, Oregon
- Crow, Texas
- Crows, Virginia
- Crow, West Virginia

=== Elsewhere ===
- Crow, Hampshire, England
- Crows Ravine, a natural landmark in Uruguay

== People ==
- Crow (surname), people with the surname Crow
- Crow people, a Native American people
- Little Crow (1810–1863), Santee Sioux leader also known as Taoyateduta
- David Loiseau (born 1979), mixed martial arts fighter nicknamed "The Crow"

== Arts, entertainment, and media ==
=== Comics and manga ===
- Crows (manga), by Hiroshi Takahashi
- The Crow (comics), a comic book series by James O'Barr
  - The Crow (franchise), a media franchise based on the comic

=== Fictional characters ===
- Crow (comics), a character in the comic series The Crow
- Crow (Destiny), a character from the Destiny video game series
- Crow, a character in the adventure game The Longest Journey and its sequel, Dreamfall
- Crow Hogan, a character in the anime series Yu-Gi-Oh! 5D's
- Crow T. Robot, a robot in the Mystery Science Theater 3000 television series
- Crows, a nickname for members of the Night's Watch in Game of Thrones
- Crows, a nickname for members of Sons of Anarchy Motorcycle Club, Redwood Original (SAMCRO) in Sons of Anarchy
- Goh "The Crow", a character in the video game Shinobido: Way of the Ninja
- Crow, a character in the game Goddess of Victory: Nikke
- Crow, the codename for Goro Akechi, a character from Persona 5

=== Films ===
- Crows (film), or Wrony, a 1994 film directed by Dorota Kędzierzawska
- The Crow (1919 film), a Western film directed by B. Reeves Eason
- The Crow (1994 film), a superhero film based on the comic books, starring Brandon Lee
- The Crow (2024 film), a superhero film based on the comic books, starring Bill Skarsgård

=== Literature ===
- Crow (poetry), a literary work by Ted Hughes
- Il corvo (The Crow), a 1762 play by Carlo Gozzi
- "The Crow" (fairy tale), a Slavic fairy tale
- The Crow (novel), a fantasy novel by Alison Croggon

=== Music ===
==== Groups and labels ====
- Crow (Australian band), an alternative band of the 1990s
- Crow (band), a Minneapolis-based rock band of the late 1960s and early 1970s
- The Crows, an American 1950s rhythm and blues group
- Crow, a 1960s psychedelic rock band of which Donna Summer became the lead singer

==== Albums and soundtracks ====
- Crows (album), a 2010 album by singer/songwriter Allison Moorer
- The Crow: New Songs for the 5-String Banjo, a 2009 Steve Martin album
- The Crow (soundtrack), the soundtrack to the 1994 film

=== Other arts, entertainment, and media ===
- Crow, a painting series by Johannes Heisig
- The Crow (card game)
- The Crow: Stairway to Heaven, a 1998 Canadian television series

== Military and weapons ==
- Crow (missile), a U.S. Navy ramjet development program
- CROWS, Common Remotely Operated Weapon System

== Science and technology ==
- Crow, a short form for crowbar a prying tool
- Crow butterflies, the milkweed butterfly genus Euploea
- Crow instability, an aerospace phenomenon
- CROW Design Manual for Bicycle Traffic

== Sports ==
- Crow (horse), a Thoroughbred racehorse
- Adelaide Crows, an Australian rules football team

== Other uses ==
- Crow (Australian Aboriginal mythology)
- Crow, one of the steam South Devon Railway 0-4-0 locomotives, Raven class
- Center for Research on Women (CROW), center run by the College of Arts & Sciences, University of Memphis
- Countryside and Rights of Way Act 2000, a British law granting a limited public right to roam
- Crow language, spoken in the Missouri Valley, United States
- Crows (candy), American brand of liquorice confection
- Crows, a nickname given to brothers of the Alpha Chi Rho fraternity
- Eating crow, a colloquial idiom for humiliation

== See also ==
- Jim Crow (disambiguation)
- Crowe (disambiguation)
