= Crow (surname) =

Crow is a surname, and may refer to:

- Ashley Crow, American actress
- Barbara Crow, Canadian sociologist
- Bob Crow, British trade union leader
- Charles A. Crow, a U.S. Representative from Missouri
- Chief Crow, Sioux leader
- Dan Crow (musician), Emmy award-winning children's musician
- Dan Crow (computer scientist), computer scientist who was in charge of Google's web crawler development as of 2007
- Dan Crow, pseudonym for author Ernest Aris
- Danny Crow, professional football player
- Dolores Crow, a U.S. Representative from Idaho
- Edward Coke Crow, American politician
- Enid Crow, artist
- Frank Fools Crow, Lakota Sioux spiritual leader
- Franklin C. Crow, American computer scientist and author
- George Crow, computer specialist
- James F. Crow, professor of Genetics
- Jason Crow, a U.S. Representative from Colorado
- Joe Medicine Crow, Crow tribe historian and author
- John Crow, Governor of the Bank of Canada
- John David Crow, professional American football player
- Kevin Crow, professional indoor soccer player
- L. C. Crow, American politician
- Louise Crow (1891–1968), American painter
- Mariesa Crow (born 1963), American electrical engineer
- Mark Crow, American basketball player
- Max Crow, Australian rules footballer
- Michael Crow, journalist
- Nancy Crow (born 1943), American art quilter and fiber artist
- Norman Crow, American politician
- Rob Crow, (born 1970), musician
- Sam Crow, disambiguation
- Shelly Crow, Second Chief of the Muscogee Nation from 1992 to 1996
- Sheryl Crow, American singer/songwriter
- Thomas S. Crow, Master Chief Petty Officer of the US Navy
- Thomas E. Crow, American historian and art critic
- Tim Crow, British psychiatrist and researcher
- Trammell Crow, American property developer
- William E. Crow, American politician

== See also ==
- Jim Crow (character), blackface character for which Jim Crow laws were named
- Crowe (surname)
