= David Crow =

David Crow is the name of:

- David Crow (entrepreneur), contributor to The Mark News
- David Crow (musician) with Osborne Brothers
- David Crow, commander of USS Vencedor

== See also ==
- David Crowe (disambiguation)
- John David Crow (1935–2015), American football player, coach, and college athletics administrator
