= Crowell =

Crowell may refer to:

== People ==
=== Surname ===
- A. Elmer Crowell, American decoy carver
- Andrew Crowell, Australian rules footballer
- Angelo Crowell, American football player
- Benedict Crowell, United States Assistant Secretary of War
- Bob Crowell, American lawyer and politician
- Clarisa Crowell, American softball coach
- Ezavier Crowell, American football running back
- Germane Crowell, American football player
- Isaiah Crowell, American football player
- James Burns Crowell, founder of J. B. Crowell and Son Brick Mould Mill Complex
- Jason Glennon Crowell, American politician in Missouri
- Jesse Crowell, American pioneer settler in Michigan
- John Crowell (Alabama politician), American politician
- John Crowell (Ohio politician), American politician
- John C. Crowell (1917–2015), American geologist
- John Franklin Crowell, American educator and president of Duke University
- John S. Crowell, founder of Crowell-Collier Publishing Company
- Josephine Crowell, Canadian actress
- Matt Crowell, Welsh footballer
- Orestes A. Crowell, American politician in Wisconsin
- Rodney Crowell, American singer/songwriter
- Samuel Crowell, American ship-captain and fur trader
- Thomas Y. Crowell, American bookbinder and father of T. Irving Crowell
  - Thomas Y. Crowell Co., American publishing company founded by Crowell
- T. Irving Crowell, American publisher and son of Thomas Y. Crowell

=== Forename ===
- Crowell Willson (1815–1894), Canadian politician
- Crowell Willson (Upper Canada) (1762–1832), American-born politician in British Canada

== Fictional characters ==
- Jolene Crowell, General Hospital
- Nadine Crowell, General Hospital

== Places ==
=== United Kingdom ===
- Crowell, Oxfordshire

=== United States ===
- Crowell, Nebraska
- Crowell, Texas
- Warren-Crowell House, a historic house in Terrell, Texas

== Other uses ==
- Thomas Y. Crowell Co., a defunct publishing company

== See also ==
- Crowe (disambiguation)
