= J J Crowe =

J J Crowe may refer to:

- John James Crowe VC (28 December 1876 – 27 February 1965), English recipient of the Victoria Cross
- Jeff Crowe (born 14 September 1958), former New Zealand cricketer.
