= Edward Dicey =

English writer, journalist, and editor

Edward Dicey CB
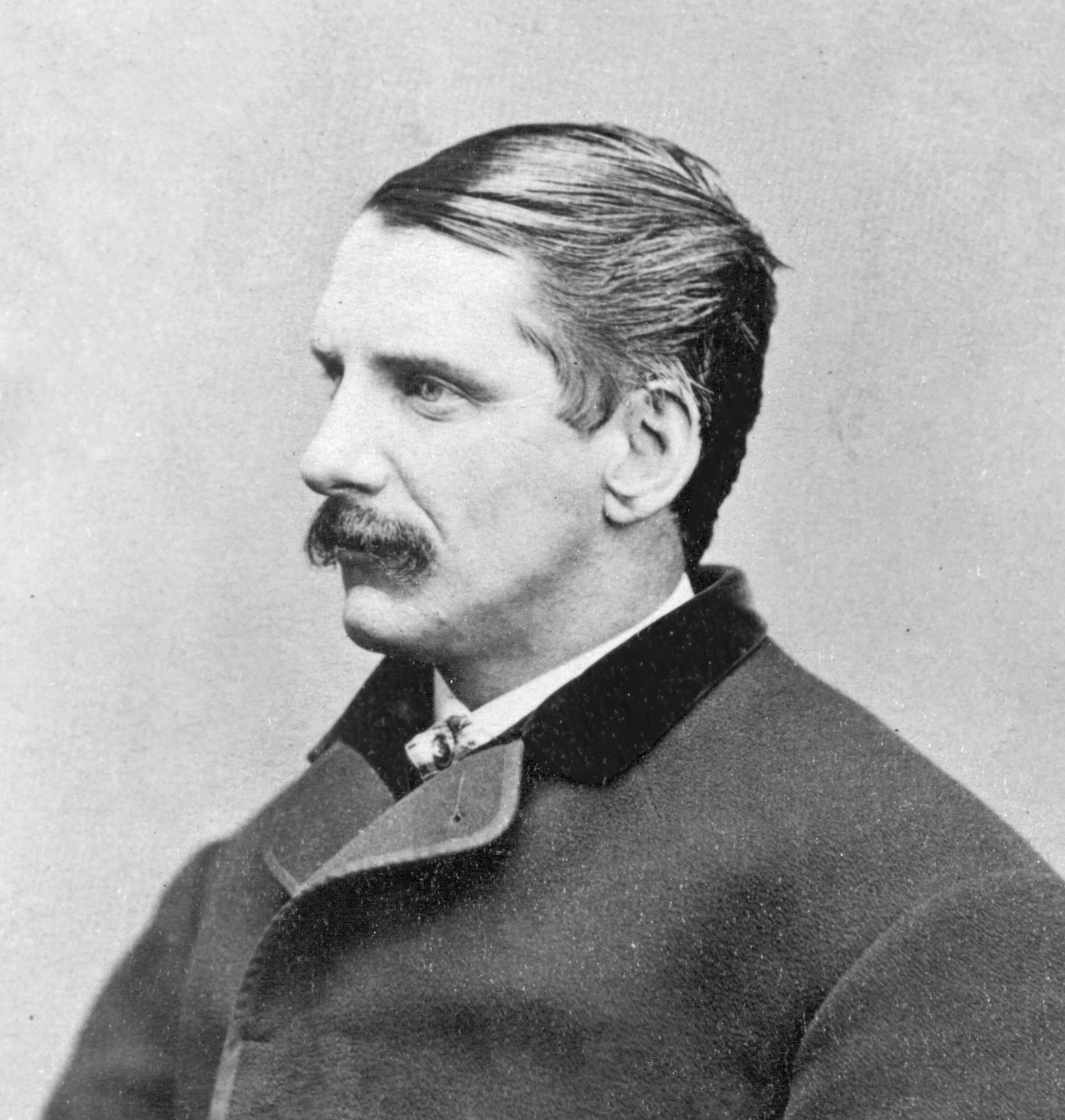
- Edward Dicey in 1865
- Born: Edward James Stephen Dicey; 15 May 1832; Leicestershire, England
- Died: 7 July 1911 (aged 79); London, England
- Education: King's College London; Trinity College, Cambridge
- Occupations: Author, journalist and editor
- Spouse: Anne Greene Chapman (1867–1878)
- Children: 1 son
- Parent(s): Thomas Edward Dicey (father); Annie Marie Stephen (mother)
- Relatives: A. V. Dicey (brother); Sir James Stephen (uncle); James Fitzjames Stephen (cousin); Leslie Stephen (cousin)

Edward James Stephen Dicey, CB (15 May 1832 – 7 July 1911) was an English writer, journalist, and editor.

== Life ==
He was born on 15 May 1832 at Claybrook, near Lutterworth, Leicestershire. He was the second son of Thomas Edward Dicey, of an old Leicestershire family, who was senior wrangler in 1811, was a pioneer of the Midland Railway, and owned the Northampton Mercury. His mother Anne Mary, was sister of Sir James Stephen; aunt of Sir James Fitzjames Stephen and Sir Leslie Stephen. His younger brother was Professor Albert Venn Dicey.

He was educated at home and, for about two years, at King's College, London. Edward went up to Trinity College, Cambridge, in 1850, was president of the Cambridge Union, and graduated B.A. in 1854 with a third class in the classical tripos, and as a senior optime in mathematics.

After leaving Cambridge he went for a short time into business without success, and then took to writing, for which he had inherited from his mother and her family a singular facility. He travelled abroad and interested himself in foreign politics. In 1861, he published both Rome in 1860 and Cavour a Memoir,. In 1862, Dicey visited America, and wrote on the American civil war in Macmillan's Magazine and the Spectator. In 1863 Six Months in the Federal States, 'met with a somewhat lukewarm reception,' on account of the northern sympathies of the author.

In 1861, Dicey became connected with The Daily Telegraph, and his style and knowledge of foreign questions led to his being made a permanent member of the staff in 1862. Among his colleagues were Sir Edwin Arnold, an old school friend, Francis Lawley, and George Augustus Sala. He was a leader-writer for the paper, and also acted as special correspondent in the Second Schleswig War, and the Austro-Prussian War.

While in the East in 1869, he accepted an offer of the editorship of the Daily News, and held this post for three months in 1870. On leaving it he at once became editor of the Observer, and filled that office for nineteen years (1870–89), continuing to write for the paper for some time after he ceased to edit it.

Subsequently, he was a constant contributor to the Nineteenth Century, the Empire Review, and other periodicals. His interest in foreign politics remained keen, especially in the affairs of Eastern Europe. He was a frequent visitor to Egypt, and formed at first hand well-defined views of England's position there, at one time advocating the annexation of the country by Great Britain. He was a strong supporter of friendly relations between England and Germany, and closely studied South African matters in later years.

Dicey had entered Gray's Inn as a student in 1865, and was called to the Bar in 1875, but did not practise. During his later life he made his home in chambers in the Inn, of which he became a bencher in 1896, and treasurer in 1903 and 1904. In 1886, he was made a C.B. He was a familiar figure at the Athenæum and Garrick Clubs. He died at his chambers in Gray's Inn on 7 July 1911, and was buried in Brompton Cemetery, the first part of the funeral service taking place in Gray's Inn Chapel.

== Family ==
He married in 1867 Anne Greene Chapman of Weymouth, Massachusetts; she died in 1878; they had one son.

== Works ==
- Rome in 1860. Cambridge: Macmillan & Co. 1861 – via Internet Archive.
- Cavour: A Memoir. Cambridge: Macmillan & Co. 1861 – via HathiTrust.
- Six Months in the Federal States. London and Cambridge: Macmillan & Co. 1863 – via HathiTrust.
- The Schleswig-Holstein War (1864)
- The Battle-Fields of 1866 (1866)
- A Month in Russia during the Marriage of the Czarevitch. London: Macmillan & Co. 1867 – via HathiTrust.
- The Morning Land. Vol. 1. London: Macmillan & Co. 1870 – via Google Books. volume 1-2 via HathiTrust
- England and Egypt (1881)
- Victor Emmanuel (1882)
- The Peasant State: An Account of Bulgaria in 1894. London: John Murray. 1894 – via Internet Archive.
- The Story of the Khedivate (1902)
- The Egypt of the Future (1907).

== Notes ==
Attribution

- This article incorporates text from a publication now in the public domain: Lucas, Charles Prestwood (1912). "Dicey, Edward James Stephen". In Lee, Sidney (ed.). Dictionary of National Biography (2nd supplement). London: Smith, Elder & Co.

Media offices
| Preceded by Thomas Walker | Editor of The Daily News; 1870–1870 | Succeeded by Frank Harrison Hill |
| Preceded by Joseph Snowe | Editor of The Observer; 1870–1889 | Succeeded by Henry Duff Traill |
