= Dan Crow =

Dan Crow may refer to:

- Dan Crow (musician), children's musician
- Dan Quine (formerly known as Dan Crow), computer scientist previously in charge of Google's web crawler development and currently CTO of Songkick
- Dan Crow, pseudonym for author Ernest Aris (1882–1963)
- Danny Crow (born 1986), English footballer
