= Savile Club =

Gentlemen's club in London, England

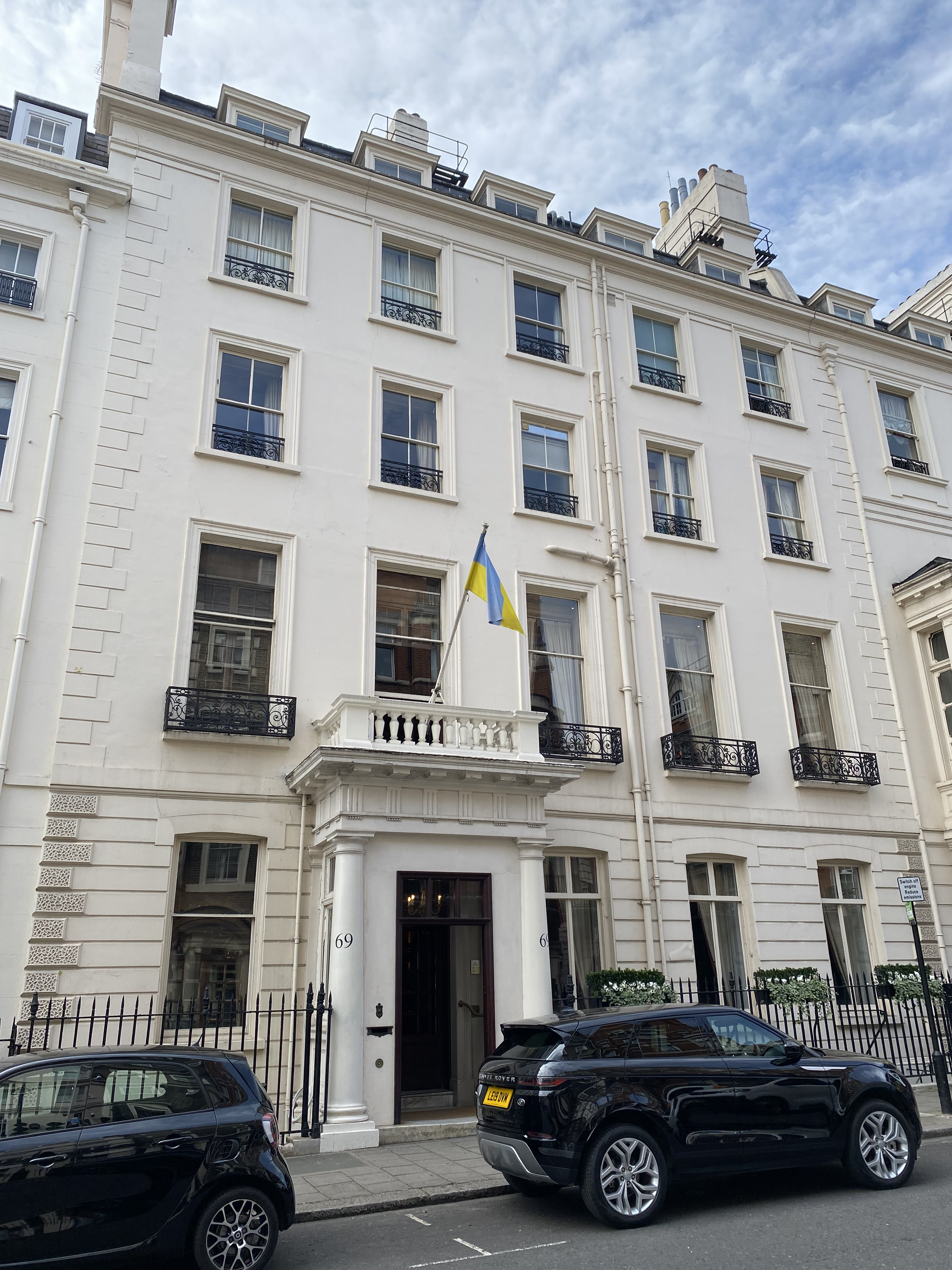
- Front of the clubhouse in 2023
- Founded: 1868; 158 years ago
- Type: Gentlemen's club
- Headquarters: 69 Brook Street, Mayfair, London W1
- Location: London, United Kingdom
- Website: savileclub.co.uk

The Savile Club is a traditional gentlemen's club in London, founded in 1868. It occupies 69 Brook Street in Mayfair and is known for a membership, past and present, drawn from a deliberately wide range of professions, with a particular strength in literature, the arts, music and science. Established largely by men of Liberal and Radical sympathies, it has from the outset been among London's leading literary and artistic clubs. Members are known as Savilians, and the club's motto, Sodalitas Convivium, expresses its founding ideal of convivial companionship around the table.

== History ==
=== Foundation and the New Club (1868–1871) ===
The club originated in 1868, when the Medical Club offered the Eclectic Club a set of rooms at 9 Spring Gardens, overlooking Trafalgar Square. After the Eclectic declined the offer, a number of its members resolved to form a new club of their own. The earliest surviving document of the club, printed in 1868, set out its guiding principles: simplicity in all arrangements, a mixture of men of different professions and opinions chosen by a careful process of election, and early-evening meetings for conversation, with meals served on the table d'hôte principle so that members dined together. Auberon Herbert, a noted Liberal and individualist, is generally regarded as the figure who did most to bring the club into being.

The earliest membership lists showed a strong preponderance of men who could be characterised as Liberals and Radicals, several of whom also belonged to the Radical Club, reflecting the reforming temper of the founders. Its principle of mixing "men of different professions and opinions" set the club apart from those organised around a single party, profession or rank, and from the start it drew a markedly varied membership – writers, scientists, lawyers, clergymen and civil servants among them, together with many Jewish members at its foundation and others who would not readily have been admitted to the more orthodox clubs of the day. Two sayings long associated with the club capture this character: Oscar Wilde is said to have looked round it and declared, "True Democrats! Not a sovereign between them", while another held that "nobody could get in unless he was an atheist or had written a book". Robert Louis Stevenson, a member from 1874, is credited with the remark, made in the billiard room, that "to play billiards well is the sign of an ill-spent youth". The Savile was regarded as the livelier counterpart to the more august Athenaeum, and members commonly resigned to join the Athenaeum as they grew older and more eminent; on leaving the Savile for the Athenaeum, H. G. Wells is said to have soon fled back, declaring, "Thank God I'm back. This is the Athenaeum of the living".

From its early years the club also drew heavily on the worlds of literature, scholarship and the arts, becoming a favoured meeting place for writers, artists and other "workers in all the arts" rather than a purely social or political club; many members were authors who presented copies of their books to the club, building up a distinctive library.

Initially calling itself the New Club—a name formally adopted on 20 May 1869—the body grew quickly. Election was by the committee and had to be unanimous, a system that eliminated the blackball; candidates passed over three times ceased to be eligible. In 1870 the club moved from the first to the second floor of 9 Spring Gardens.

In 1871 the New Club combined with members of the Anglo-American Association and resolved to take 15 Savile Row. Trustees Walter Morrison, James Heywood, and Anthony Mundella were appointed in August 1871, and the name Savile Club was adopted, having been chosen on 19 July 1871. The annual subscription and entrance fee, each set at two guineas when the club opened in 1868, were raised to four and six guineas respectively on the move to Savile Row.

=== Savile Row and Piccadilly (1871–1927) ===
From 1876 the Savile and the Arts Club exchanged hospitality during their respective summer closures, an arrangement that lasted about a decade and was revived at the end of the century. In the same year the membership ceiling was raised from 500 to 550. By 1882 the club had outgrown Savile Row and moved to 107 Piccadilly, a bow-windowed house leased from Lord Rosebery and formerly the home of Baron Meyer de Rothschild; the twenty-seven-year lease was taken in June 1882 for £11,000, and with its views over Green Park the house was remembered by members as an ideal clubhouse.

At Piccadilly whist became the staple card game, and a gambling night known as the "Club Birthday" was held near Christmas, when the usual stake limits were suspended. Enthusiasts later took up poker, which the committee declared a gambling game in 1896–97 and thereafter restricted to Birthdays. The subscription was raised to a uniform six guineas in 1899, to seven guineas in 1913 and to ten in 1919, and around 1907 a new lease was taken through a company formed for the purpose, the Savile Club Limited. According to the club's later historian Garrett Anderson, Oscar Wilde was deferred from membership of the Savile and joined the Albemarle Club instead.

=== Brook Street (1927–1945) ===
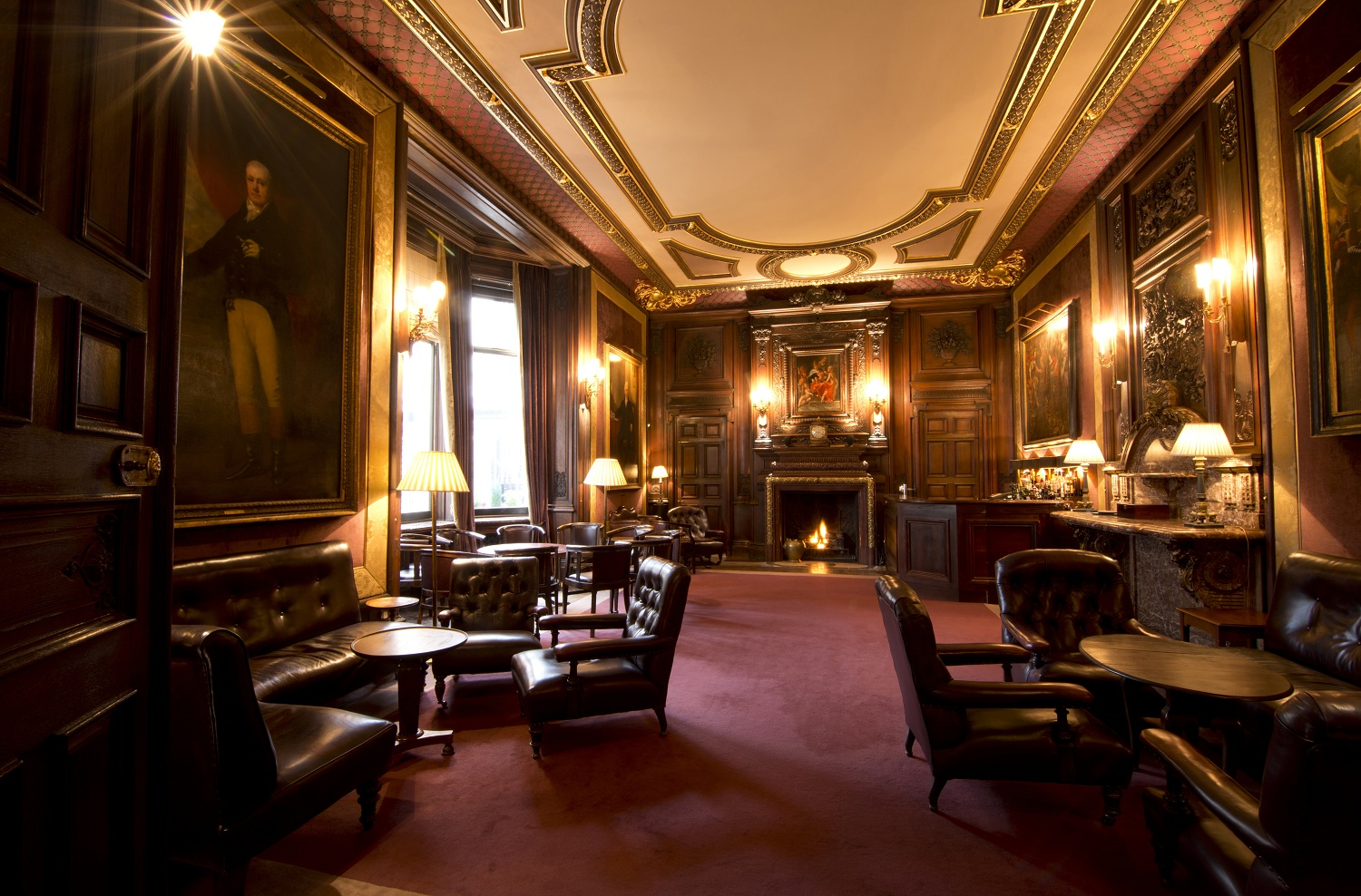
The Savile Club's bar

After some fifty years at Piccadilly, an expiring lease and structural problems – worsened by building work next door for the Park Lane Hotel – prompted a further move. On 1 November 1927 the club took up a ninety-year lease of 69 Brook Street in Mayfair. The house had been built in the 1720s under leases from the Grosvenor estate; in 1850 Edward Digby, 2nd Earl Digby commissioned Thomas Cundy II to add its Doric porch. It was later the home of "Loulou" Harcourt, a Liberal cabinet minister, and his wife Mary Ethel Harcourt. The lavish dix-huitième interior was commissioned by Walter Hayes Burns, Lady Harcourt's father and the brother-in-law of J. P. Morgan, who engaged the Paris architect William Bouwens van der Boijen to remodel the combined houses at 69 and 71 Brook Street, creating an elegant hall, a grand staircase and a Louis XV-style ballroom.

A house-warming was held in 1928, with music provided by members, and in 1953 the club marked 25 years in Brook Street with a reception at which Peter Ustinov entertained. The club remained open through World War II but came close to collapse soon afterwards, recording losses of around £6,000 in 1949 and £8,000 in 1950 before economies, a higher subscription, and the appointment of a combined secretary and catering manager restored its finances.

=== Surviving the 1970s and revival (1945–1991) ===
A Savile Club Endowment Fund was established in 1962 to provide a reserve against future financial difficulty. The club celebrated its centenary in 1968 with a dinner, a fanfare composed by Malcolm Arnold, and a commemorative pamphlet to which Compton Mackenzie, Ralph Richardson, J. B. Priestley, John le Carré and others contributed.

The 1970s were difficult for London clubs generally, many of which merged or closed. After the film producer Michael Balcon resigned over a rejected candidate and led an exodus of film and television members to the Garrick Club, the Savile – sometimes described as an unofficial canteen of the BBC – lost many members. A succession of mishaps in 1974–75, including a collapsed dining-room ceiling and fires that destroyed part of the club's archives, gave way to a revival from November 1975 under a capable new secretary, Peter Aldersley, a former actor and broadcaster, who with a new chef raised the club's standards. In 1993 the member Garrett Anderson published a full-length history of the club, Hang Your Halo in the Hall!, its title taken from a remark by the screenwriter member Lothar Mendes.

=== Recent history (1991–present) ===
During the 1990s, the club leased parts of the house to two smaller bodies: the Flyfishers' Club, which took a twenty-one-year lease in 1995 and brought its large angling library, and the Portland Club, the historic card club, from 1997. A new seventy-five-year lease of the building was concluded with the Grosvenor estate in 1996, funded in part by the sale of debentures and of the Persian and Turkish ceramics given to the club by Sir Alan Barlow.

Serious financial anxieties after 2000 brought the club close to closure, and in 2002 the committee appointed an executive chairman for the first time. New management, an increase in membership, more active hire of the premises and the appointment in 2005 of a Michelin-trained head chef placed the club on a sounder footing. A member who was an architect oversaw an extended programme of restoration, and in 2008 the Brook Street Trust was established as a charity to preserve and maintain the building's French interiors. The basements were opened up in 2011 to create the Darwin Room and other spaces, and the library was remodelled to rehouse the club's collection.

The club's 150th anniversary was marked in May 2018 with a celebration dinner, a concert and a series of commemorative volumes. It closed during the COVID-19 pandemic from March 2020, reopening that July, with a series of historical bulletins circulated to members during the lockdowns. By 2020, the membership had grown to close to a thousand, and the club had begun to attract a notably younger membership while retaining its strong literary, artistic and scientific character.

== Symbols and traditions ==
Members are known as Savilians. The club's motto, Sodalitas Convivium, expresses its founding ideal of convivial companionship around the table.

The preferred dress remains jacket and tie. Under club etiquette, members do not shake hands after they have initially met.

== The clubhouse ==
The club's home since 1927, 69 Brook Street, is among the most richly decorated of London's clubhouses, retaining the hall, grand staircase and Louis XV-style ballroom created for the Burns and Harcourt families. From the 1990s the Flyfishers' Club and Portland Club occupied parts of the building under sub-leases, providing additional income. Since 2008 the Brook Street Trust has raised funds for the conservation of the interiors, described by the trust as one of the finest complete sets of French interiors in London; restoration work in the 2000s and 2010s included the bedrooms, the drawing room, a new ground-floor corridor and the opening up of the tiled basements, whose late nineteenth-century tiles came from the same Gien factory that supplied the first lines of the Paris Métro.

== Activities ==
The mainstays of the Savile are food and drink, conversation, bridge, poker and Savile snooker—a nineteenth-century variant of the game whose rules were first written down in the mid-twentieth century by Stephen Potter. Some older customs have lapsed: the cigar dinners that ended with the smoking ban (since revived on the terrace), the "penny game" played on the staircase banisters, which disappeared with decimalisation, and the Friday-night candlelit dinners.

The musical tradition continues with lunchtime and evening concerts, jazz evenings, sponsorship of music students and an annual St Cecilia's Day concert, and the club holds regular "Science at the Savile" talks.

Mobile telephones are strictly restricted, and reading any form of papers, including both books and newspapers, is forbidden in the public areas, except in the Morning Room. Fostering a conversational atmosphere remains central to the club's culture; those sitting alone are generally offered or invited to join a group of other members.

== Women members ==
The admission of women has been raised repeatedly throughout the club's history, and was taken up unusually early for a Victorian gentlemen's club. Arrangements for women to be entertained as guests were contemplated in the club's first year, 1868, and the question was debated again at the first general meeting after the move to Savile Row in 1871, when opinion divided almost equally. By the 1880s, after the move to 107 Piccadilly, women were being admitted to the club to watch royal and military processions pass the building. The club returned to the question in 1949, 1954, 1969, and 1976 without changing the rules, and women were gradually admitted as guests more widely over the twentieth century, by the early 2000s being welcomed throughout the clubhouse. Full membership has remained reserved to men: at the most recent vote, in January 2025, 53 percent of members voted against allowing women as members, 45 percent in favour, and 2 percent abstained, short of the two-thirds majority required to change the rules.

== Notable members ==
The Savile Club's membership has included many prominent figures; some 200 Fellows of the Royal Society were members between 1868 and 1923.

== See also ==
- List of members' clubs in London
