= David Crowe =

David Crowe may refer to:

- David Crowe (software engineer) (born 1966), American businessman and software engineer
- David Crowe (comedian), comedian from Seattle, Washington
- Dave Crowe (1933–2000), New Zealand cricketer
- David M. Crowe, historian and Elon University Professor Emeritus

== See also ==
- David Crow (disambiguation)
