= Masanori Hata =

Japanese zoologist, essayist, and filmmaker (1935–2023)

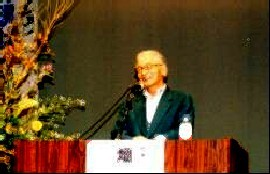
Hata in 2003

Masanori Hata (畑 正憲, Hata Masanori; 17 April 1935 – 5 April 2023) was a Japanese zoologist, essayist, and filmmaker. A popular essayist under the pen name Mutsugorō, he was awarded the Kikuchi Kan Prize for his writing in 1977. He was perhaps best known in the West as the director and screenwriter of the 1986 film The Adventures of Milo and Otis.

== Biography ==
Hata was born in Fukuoka Prefecture on 17 April 1935. He graduated from the Faculty of Biology at Tokyo University in 1958, and went on to complete a master's degree in 1959. Trained as a zoologist, he worked as a documentary filmmaker producing nature films. He moved to the eastern coast of Hokkaidō to establish the Mutsugorō Animal Kingdom nature preserve, where he and his family lived with over 300 wild and domestic animals. He was the author of over 100 books, including collections of his Mutsugorō essays on nature such as Warera dōbutsu mina kyōdai (All of Us Animals Are Brothers and Sisters, 1967) and Mutsogorō no hakubutsushi (Mutsugoro's Natural History, 1975).

Over four years, Hata and associate director Kon Ichikawa shot 400,000 feet of film at the Mutsugorō Animal Kingdom. The resulting film, about the adventures of an orange tabby cat and a fawn pug, was released by Toho in 1986 as Koneko Monogatari (子猫物語, A Kitten's Story) and was the highest-grossing film of the year in Japan, taking in about $36 million. It was shown that year at the Cannes Film Festival as The Adventures of Chatran. For US distribution by Columbia Pictures, it was cut down from 90 to 76 minutes and narration in English by Dudley Moore was added. It was released in 1989 as The Adventures of Milo and Otis.

Hata died on 5 April 2023, at the age of 87.
