= William Crow =

William Crow may refer to:

- William Crow (MP) (fl. 1698–1699), Irish politician
- William E. Crow (1870–1922), American lawyer and Republican party politician
- William J. Crow (1902–1974), U.S. Representative from Pennsylvania
- Bill Crow (born 1927), jazz guitarist

== See also ==
- William Crowe (disambiguation)
