= The Adventures of Milo and Otis =

1986 film by Masanori Hata

- Theatrical release poster
- 子猫物語
- Directed by: Masanori Hata
- Screenplay by: Masanori Hata
- Produced by: Masuru Kakutani; Satoru Ogata
- Narrated by: Shigeru Tsuyuki
- Cinematography: Hideo Fujii; Shinji Tomita
- Edited by: Chizuko Osada
- Music by: Ryuichi Sakamoto
- Production company: Fuji Television
- Distributed by: Toho
- Release date: July 12, 1986
- Running time: 92 minutes
- Country: Japan
- Language: Japanese
- Budget: ¥800 million
- Box office: ¥9.8 billion

The Adventures of Milo and Otis (Japanese: 子猫物語, Hepburn: Koneko Monogatari; lit. "A Kitten's Story"; alternate English title, The Adventures of Chatran) is a 1986 Japanese adventure comedy-drama film about two animals: Milo, an orange tabby cat, and Otis, a pug. The original Japanese version, narrated by Shigeru Tsuyuki and with poetry recitation by Kyōko Koizumi, was released on July 12, 1986. Fuji TV's international subsidiary, Fujisankei Communications International removed 15 minutes from the original film and released a shorter English-language version, written by Mark Saltzman and narrated by Dudley Moore; this version was released in North America by Columbia Pictures on August 25, 1989.

== Plot ==
On Nippon Farm, a mother cat has given birth to kittens. One of the kittens is named Milo (Chatran (チャトラン, Chatoran; literally Brown Tiger) in the Japanese version), and has a habit of being too curious and getting himself into trouble. He meets a pug puppy named Otis (Poosky (プー助, Pūsuke) in the Japanese version), and they soon become friends. One day, when Milo is hiding inside a box floating in the river, it breaks loose from the dock, and he accidentally drifts downstream. Otis runs after Milo, who himself goes on many adventures, escaping one obstacle after another.

Milo encounters a bear, escapes from a raven and Deadwood Swamp, steals a dead muskrat from a fox, follows a railroad called Nippon Bearway to the home of a deer who shelters him, sleeps in a nest with an owl, stays for a while with a pig and her piglets, catches a fish and is robbed of it by a raccoon, is mobbed by seagulls, and evades another bear, then a snake, before falling into a deep pit.

For his part, Otis follows Milo throughout, usually only an hour behind and less than a mile out of range. Finally, the two catch up with one another. While Milo is in the hole, Otis pulls him out by means of a rope. Milo and Otis are reunited, and soon find mates of their own: Joyce, a white cat, for Milo; and Sondra, a French pug, for Otis. Afterward, they briefly part ways and raise offspring of their own. Later, Milo, Otis, Joyce, and Sondra (along with their litters) happily find their way back together through the forest to their farm.

== Characters ==
All characters are voiced by the narrator, Shigeru Tsuyuki (Japanese) and Dudley Moore (English).

- Milo (Chatran)
- Otis (Poosky)
- Milo's mother (Chatran's mother)
- Gloria
- Frog
- Gloria's chick
- Crawfish
- Bears
- Raven
- Sea Turtle
- Fox
- Deer
- Owl
- Pig
- Raccoon
- Seagulls
- Snake
- Joyce
  - some of her kittens
- Sondra
  - some of her puppies

== Production ==
Director and screenwriter Masanori Hata and assistance director Kon Ichikawa edited the film together from 74 hours of footage (400,000 ft or 120,000 m of film), shot over a period of four years.

== Soundtrack ==
The original Japanese soundtrack, released as The Adventures of Chatran: Original Soundtrack, was composed by Ryuichi Sakamoto and included "Koneko Monogatari" (子猫物語), a theme song performed by Keiko Yoshinaga. During the promotion of the film in Japan, the song "Neko Jita Gokoro mo Koi no Uchi" (猫舌ごころも恋のうち; "My Heart Has a Dislike for Love", lit. I with a cat tongue heart toward romance), originally recorded by Ushiroyubi Sasaregumi for the Fuji TV anime series High School Kimengumi, was used in commercials for the film.

The musical score for the English-language version was composed by Michael Boddicker. Music was borrowed from Elmer Bernstein's score to To Kill a Mockingbird (specifically the two cues, "Roll in the Tire" and "Peekaboo" with minor changes in the music), and John Williams' score to The Witches of Eastwick. The song "Walk Outside", written by Dick Tarrier, is performed by Dan Crow in the opening shots and end credits.

The English-language version of the film also contained music by classical composers including:

- "Soldier's Dance" from William Tell – Gioachino Rossini
- "Serenade" – Franz Schubert
- Appalachian Spring – Aaron Copland
- "Of Foreign Lands and People" from Scenes from Childhood, Op. 15 – Robert Schumann
- King Cotton – John Philip Sousa
- "Auf dem Wasser zu singen", D 774 – Franz Schubert
- "The Elephant" from The Carnival of the Animals – Camille Saint-Saens
- "People with Long Ears" from The Carnival of the Animals – Camille Saint-Saëns
- "Dialogue Between the Wind and the Waves" from La Mer – Claude Debussy
- Perpetuum Mobile, Op. 257 – Johann Strauss, Jr.
- "How Beautifully Blue the Sky" – Gilbert and Sullivan
- Waltz No. 16 in A♭ major, Op. posth. – Frédéric Chopin
- Impromptu in B♭ – Franz Schubert
- "Berceuse" from Dolly Suite, Op. 56 – Gabriel Fauré
- "Bourrée" from Terpsichore – Michael Praetorius
- Piano Concerto in A minor, Op. 54 – Edvard Grieg
- "Symphony in D minor" – César Franck
- Flute Sonata in E♭ major, BWV 1031 – Johann Sebastian Bach
- "Petrushka's Cell" from "Petrushka" – Igor Stravinsky

== Video game adaptation ==
In 1986, to tie in with the original Japanese version of the film, a Japan-exclusive video game was released for the Famicom Disk System.

== Release ==
The film was shown during the film market at the 1986 Cannes Film Festival before opening on 200 screens in Japan on July 12, 1986.

== Reception ==
=== Box office ===
It was the number-one Japanese film on the domestic market in 1986, earning ¥5.4 billion in distribution income that year. It grossed a total of ¥9.8 billion ($90,822,000) in Japan. At the time, it was the third highest-grossing film ever in Japan, beaten only by E.T. the Extra-Terrestrial (1982) and Antarctica (1983).

In the United States, The Adventures of Milo and Otis grossed $13.3 million, adding up to a combined $104,122,000 grossed in Japan and the United States.

Adjusted for inflation, the film grossed the equivalent of $226 million in Japan as of 2021 and $35 million in the United States as of 2025, for a combined inflation-adjusted $261 million in Japan and the United States.

In terms of box office admissions, the film sold 7.5 million tickets in Japan, 3.2 million tickets in the United States, and 1.3 million tickets in Germany and France, for a combined 12 million tickets sold in Japan, North America and Mainland Europe.

=== Home media ===
In 2010, the film's DVD version sold 810,334 units and grossed $5,464,010 in the United States. It was released on Blu-ray on January 24, 2012.

=== Critical reception ===
Reviews for the US version were positive, with an 80% approval rating on Rotten Tomatoes, based on 10 reviews and an average rating of 6.9/10. Metacritic assigned the film a weighted average score of 72 out of 100, based on 7 critics, indicating "generally favourable reviews".

== Animal cruelty allegations ==
When the film was released, some animal welfare organizations alleged to have had a number of complaints from people who had seen the film and were concerned that it could not have been made without cruelty. The Tasmanian and Victorian branches of the RSPCA also alleged abuse.

The film was reported to have the approval of the American Humane Society. The American Humane Association attempted to investigate cruelty rumors through "contacts in Europe who normally have information on movies throughout the world." While noting that the contacts had also heard the allegations, they were unable to verify them. The organization also reported, "We have tried through humane people in Japan, and through another Japanese producer to determine if these rumors are true, but everything has led to a dead end." The same report noted that several Japanese Humane Societies allowed their names to be used in connection with the film and that the film "shows no animals being injured or harmed."

In October 1998, the Japanese magazine Josei Jishin published allegations of animal cruelty during the production of Koneko Monogatari (The Adventures of Milo and Otis). The claims were made by Mikio Hata (畑 三喜雄), the younger brother of director Masanori Hata, who was also credited as the film's animal director.

In the issue dated 6 October 1998, Mikio Hata stated:

"My brother was the main culprit, but everyone there, including me, was an accomplice... Chatran died... it was an accident... you could even say he was killed..."

A follow-up on 20 October 1998 included anonymous staff testimony supporting his claims, such as anesthesia overdoses, cliff-throwing, and proposed surgical interventions on animals including sewing piglets together for a specific visual effect.

At the time, Masanori Hata denied the accusations in a rival magazine, Josei Seven (Shogakukan), as corroborated by a 2014 summary in *Excite / Lite‑ra*.

== Awards ==
- The Japanese Academy (1987)
  - Won: Popularity Award - Most Popular Film
  - Nominated: Award of the Japanese Academy - Best Music Score (Ryuichi Sakamoto)
- Young Artist Awards (1990)
  - Nominated: Young Artist Award - Best Family Motion Picture – Adventure
