= William Crowe =

William Crowe may refer to:

- William Crowe (bibliographer) (1616–1675)
- William Crowe (Dean of Clonfert) (1657–1726), Irish priest
- William Crowe (politician) (fl. 1703), MP for Blessington (Parliament of Ireland constituency)
- William Crowe (poet) (1745–1829), English poet
- William J. Crowe (1925–2007), former chairman of the U.S. Joint Chiefs of Staff
- Wil Crowe (born 1994), American baseball pitcher for the Kia Tigers
- William Crowe, the main character of the video game Heroes of the Pacific

== See also ==
- William Crow (disambiguation)
