= John Crow (disambiguation) =

John Crow was the fifth governor of the Bank of Canada.

John Crow may also refer to:

- John crow, a local name for the turkey vulture in Jamaica
- John Crow Mountains, a range of mountains in Jamaica
- John David Crow (born 1935), Heisman Trophy winner
- Jack Crow, recurring name used by author, John Steakley

== See also ==
- John Crowe (disambiguation)
- Jim Crow (disambiguation)
