= Frank Harrison Hill =

English journalist (1830–1910)

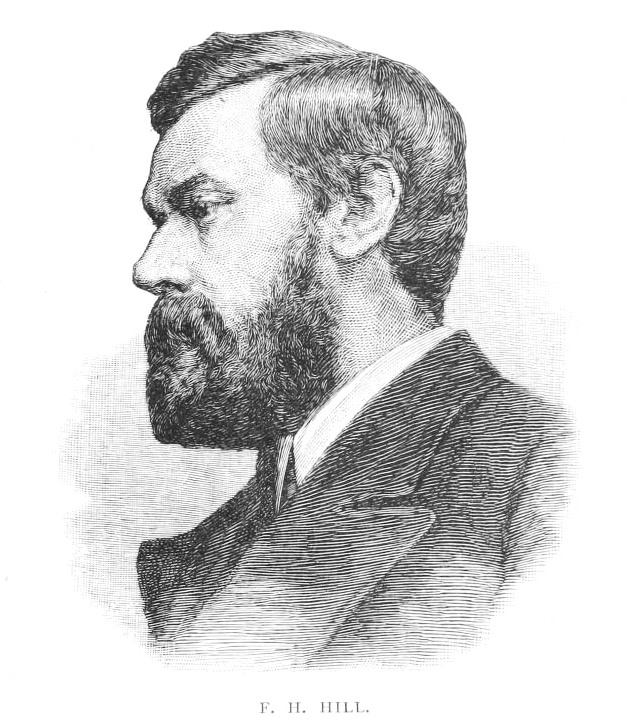

Frank Harrison Hill (1830–1910) was an English journalist.

== Life ==
Baptised on 4 March 1830 at Boston, Lincolnshire, he was younger son of George Hill, merchant there, by his wife Betsy, sister of Pishey Thompson. Educated at Boston grammar school, Hill entered as a divinity student the Unitarian New College, Manchester, where he studied under James Martineau. In June 1851 he completed the five years' course of study for the ministry, but he may never have preached. Meanwhile, in 1848 he had matriculated at the University of London, and having graduated B.A. in the first class in 1851 acted from 1853 to 1855 as private tutor in the family of Dukinfield Darbishire of Manchester; the elder of his pupils, S. D. Darbishire, was subsequently known as the stroke of the Oxford University boat (1868–70), and afterwards practised as a doctor at Oxford. Somewhat later Hill became tutor in the family of Mrs. Salis Schwabe, also of Manchester.

Hill is thought to have owed his introduction to journalism to Henry Dunckley and Richard Holt Hutton. On the death in 1861 of James Simms, editor of the Northern Whig, the journal of the Ulster liberals, he took up the post in Belfast; at the time, the American Civil War was influencing party politics at Westminster, and, alone of Irish journalists, Hill supported the Union.

Through Martineau, Hill made the acquaintance of Harriet Martineau, then on the staff of The Daily News and like himself a staunch supporter of the northern states. He also came to know Henry Crabb Robinson, Robert Browning, and William Johnson Fox. At the suggestion of Frank Finlay, who was proprietor of the Northern Whig and his wife's brother, Hill was summoned at the end of 1865 to London to become assistant editor of The Daily News. Under John Russell, 1st Earl Russell, the Liberal Party was demanding measures that went further than the older Whig tradition, and Hill championed such a line. At the same time he wrote for the Saturday Review.

On the retirement of Thomas Walker from the editorship of The Daily News in 1869, Edward Dicey filled the post for a few months; but Hill shortly succeeded Dicey, and then held the editorship for 17 years. The price had been reduced from threepence to one penny a year before he took the post. Hill continued to give steady support to William Ewart Gladstone's administration, and the journal became an influential party organ.

Under Hill's editorship and the management of John Richard Robinson, The Daily News attained further influence and popularity. Hill collected a notable body of leader-writers: Peter William Clayden, Justin McCarthy, William Minto, John Macdonell, George Saintsbury, Andrew Lang, and later Herbert Paul. William Black the novelist. Sir Henry Lucy, and Frances Power Cobbe were occasional writers or auxiliary members of the staff. Hill himself wrote constantly, and had good political contacts.

In 1886 Hill declined to accept Gladstone's Home Rule policy; and the proprietors abruptly sacked him (he returned the cheque for a year's salary sent by the proprietors on his retirement). By the end of the year he was the regular political leader-writer of The World, and held that post for twenty years. He became a frequent contributor to the Nineteenth Century.

Hill was called to the bar at Lincoln's Inn in 1872, but never practised the law. He died suddenly at 13 Morpeth Terrace, Westminster, on 28 June 1910. By his will bequeathed 1000l. to the Boston grammar school, to found an exhibition from the school to any English university.

== Works ==
While the Reform Bill 1866 was passing through Parliament, Hill contributed to a volume of essays, Questions for a Reformed Parliament (1867), an article on the political claims of Ireland. From his journalism he collected a series of Political Portraits, which was published separately in 1873 and went through several editions. A life of George Canning which he wrote for the English Worthies series (1881) was a lucid text on Canning's political aims and difficulties rather than a work of research.

Hill contributed to the Fortnightly Review (1878) a scathing series on The Political Adventures of Lord Beaconsfield; and to the Edinburgh Review (July 1887) an appreciative article on Mr. Gladstone and the Liberal Party.

== Family ==
In June 1862 Hill married Jane Dalzell Finlay, daughter of Francis Dalzell Finlay, the proprietor of the Northern Whig, and a contributor to its literary section of that paper; James Martineau officiated. After her marriage Jane Hill continued to write literary articles and reviews, mainly in the Saturday Review. She died in 1904.

== Notes ==
Attribution

This article incorporates text from a publication now in the public domain: Lee, Sidney, ed. (1912). "Hill, Frank Harrison". Dictionary of National Biography (2nd supplement). Vol. 2. London: Smith, Elder & Co.
