= George Crowe (disambiguation) =

George Crowe (1921–2011) was an American baseball and basketball player.

George Crowe may also refer to:

- George Crowe (cricketer) (1885–1976), English cricketer
- George Crowe (ice hockey) (1936–2019), Canadian ice hockey coach
- George Crowe (1841–1889), husband of actress Kate Bateman

== See also ==
- George Crow, computer entrepreneur
