= Giovanni Battista Cavalcaselle =

Italian writer and art critic (1819–1897)

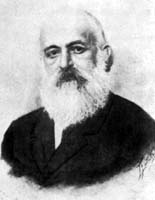
Giovanni Battista Cavalcaselle.

Giovanni Battista Cavalcaselle (22 January 1819 – 31 October 1897) was an Italian writer and art critic, best known as part of "Crowe and Cavalcaselle", for the many works in English on art history he co-authored with Joseph Archer Crowe. Their multi-volume A New History of Painting in Italy continued to be revised and republished until 1909, after both were dead. Though now outdated, these are still often cited by modern art historians.

== Biography ==
Cavalcaselle was born in Legnago, Veneto. He studied at the Academy of Fine Arts in Venice. Cavalcaselle participated in the Revolution of 1848 and in the Roman Republic, and was sentenced to death in absentia. After the fall of the republic he lived in England for several years. There he published, together with Joseph A. Crowe, their first joint work, Early Flemish Painters (1856), later followed by the History of Painting in Italy (3 volumes, 1864-1866). Other important works by Crowe and Cavalcaselle are The Life of Titian (London, 1876), and The Life of Raphael (London, 1883).

He worked as a consultant on acquisitions for the National Gallery, London. By the late 1850s he was able to revisit Rome. In 1867 he was made inspector of the Bargello museum in Florence. He returned to Rome in 1875 to become the chief of the art department at ministerial level under the Minister of Public Instruction, until 1893.

== Publications ==
With Crowe:

- J. A. Crowe and G. B. Cavalcaselle (1857). The Early Flemish Painters: Notices of their Lives and Works. Albemarle Street, London: John Murray.
- Joseph Archer Crowe and Giovanni Battista Cavalcaselle (1909). Edward Hutton (ed.). A New History of Painting in Italy, from the Second to the Sixteenth Century, Volume II of three volumes: The Sienese school of the XIVth century; The Florentine School of the XVth century. JM Dent (London) and EP Dutton (New York).
- Joseph Archer Crowe and Giovanni Battista Cavalcaselle (1912). Tancred Borenius (ed.). A History of Painting in North Italy, Venice, Padua, Vicenza, Verona, Ferrara, Milan, Friuli, Brescia, from the Fourteenth to the Sixteenth Century, Volume 1 (no preview). Albemarle Street, London: John Murray.
- Joseph Archer Crowe and Giovanni Battista Cavalcaselle (1871). A History of Painting in North Italy, Venice, Padua, Vicenza, Verona, Ferrara, Milan, Friuli, Brescia, from the Fourteenth to the Sixteenth Century, Volume 2. Albemarle Street, London: John Murray.
- Titian: his Life and Times (in two volumes, 1877)
- Raphael: his Life and Works (in two volumes 1883-5)

== Bibliography ==
- "Dictionary": Biography from the Dictionary of Art Historians
- This article incorporates text from a publication now in the public domain: Cust, Lionel Henry (1901). "Crowe, Joseph Arthur". In Lee, Sidney (ed.). Dictionary of National Biography (1st supplement). London: Smith, Elder & Co.
