= Eyre Crowe =

British diplomat (1864–1925)

Sir Eyre Crowe GCB GCMG
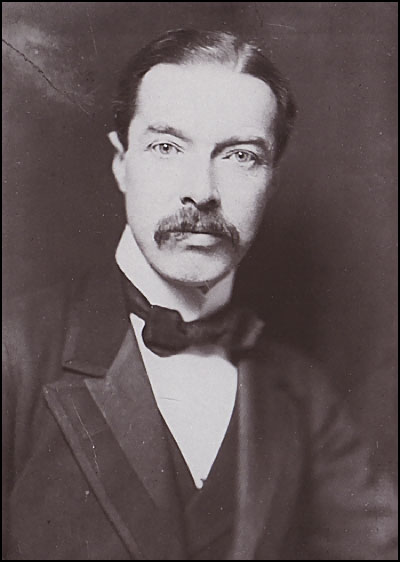
- Sir Eyre Crowe
- Born: 30 July 1864; Leipzig, German Confederation
- Died: 28 April 1925 (aged 60)
- Occupation: Diplomat
- Known for: Memorandum on the Present State of British Relations with France and Germany (1907)
- Relatives: Brian Crowe (grandson)

Sir Eyre Alexander Barby Wichart Crowe GCB GCMG (30 July 1864 – 28 April 1925) was a British diplomat, an expert on, and opponent of Germany in the Foreign and Commonwealth Office. He is best known for his vehement warning, in 1907, that Germany's expansionism was motivated by animosity towards Britain and should provoke a closer Entente Cordiale between the British Empire and France.

At the Paris Peace Conference of 1919, Crowe worked with the French President Georges Clemenceau. Although Lloyd George and Crowe's rivals in the Foreign Office tried to prevent his promotion and lessen his influence, Crowe served as Permanent Under-Secretary at the Foreign Office from 1920 until his death in 1925, as a consequence of his patronage by the Foreign Secretary, Lord Curzon.

== Early life ==
Half-German, Crowe was born in Leipzig in 1864. He was educated at Düsseldorf, at Berlin, and in France. His father, Joseph Archer Crowe (1825–1896), was a British Consul-General and Chief European Commercial Attaché between 1882 and 1896, and also an art historian. His mother was Asta von Barby (c. 1841 – 1908). His grandfather Eyre Evans Crowe was a journalist and historian, and his uncle, Eyre Crowe, was an artist.

Crowe first visited England in 1882, when he was seventeen, to cram for the Foreign Office examination. At the time, he was not fully fluent in English. Even later in life it was reported that when angry he spoke English with a German accent.

== Foreign Office ==
Crowe entered the Foreign Office in 1885 and until 1895 was resident clerk. He served as assistant to Clement Lloyd Hill in the African Protectorates' Department, but when responsibility for the protectorates was handed over to the Colonial Office he was asked to reform the registry system. His success led to his appointment as senior clerk in the Western Department in 1906, and in January 1907 he produced an unsolicited Memorandum on the Present State of British Relations with France and Germany for the Foreign Office. The memorandum stated Crowe's belief that Germany desired "hegemony" first "in Europe, and eventually in the world". Crowe stated that Germany presented a threat to the balance of power in Europe similar to the threat posed by Philip II of Spain, the Bourbons and Napoleon. Crowe opposed appeasement of Germany because:

To give way to the blackmailer's menaces enriches him, but it has long been proved by uniform experience that, although this may secure for the victim temporary peace, it is certain to lead to renewed molestation and higher demands after ever-shortening periods of amicable forbearance.

Crowe further argued Britain should never give in to Germany's demands since:

The blackmailer's trade is generally ruined by the first resolute stand made against his exactions and the determination rather to face all risks of a possibly disagreeable situation than to continue in the path of endless concessions.

Sir Edward Grey, the Foreign Secretary, said he found Crowe's memorandum "most valuable". Grey circulated the paper to the Prime Minister Campbell-Bannerman, Asquith, Ripon and Morley but there is no evidence either way that any of them either read or were influenced by the argument. The historian Richard Hamilton states: "Though a life-long Liberal, Crowe came to despise the Liberal Cabinets of 1906–1914, including Sir Edward Grey, for what he perceived as their irresolute attitude to Germany".

Crowe regarded the Agadir Crisis of 1911 as "a trial of strength, if anything ... Concession means not loss of interests or loss of prestige. It means defeat, with all its inevitable consequences". He urged Grey to send a gunboat to Agadir. Historian Christopher Clark wrote that "Crowe became one of Whitehall's most implacable opponents of rapprochment with Germany.

Throughout the Foreign Office Documents for the period 28 June to 4 August 1914, Crowe's footnotes to telegrams and letters, and his memoranda, are often biased without reason and blatantly anti-German and could be argued to be a determining malign influence on Sir Edward Grey. Detractors of Crowe, for example the historian John Charmley, argue that he was unduly pessimistic about Germany and by making warnings like these was encouraging war.

During the July Crisis of 1914 Crowe wrote Grey a memorandum: "The argument that there is no written bond binding us to France is strictly correct. There is no contractual obligation. But the Entente has been made, strengthened, put to the test and celebrated in a manner justifying the belief that a moral bond was being forged ... our duty and our interest will be seen to lie in standing by France ... The theory that England cannot engage in a big war means her abdication as an independent state ... A balance of power cannot be maintained by a State that is incapable of fighting and consequently carries no weight". On 24 July Crowe sent a memo to Grey, saying Germany was aiming at a political dictatorship in Europe and was opposed to individual freedom, which was false. In a memorandum of 31 July, Crowe, putting pressure upon Grey, told him that Britain had a "moral obligation" to its friend (France) across the channel which was "surely undeniable".

During the First World War, Crowe served in the Contraband Department, and at the start of the 1919 Paris Peace Conference he was Assistant Under-Secretary of State for Foreign Affairs; in June he was head of the political section of the British Delegation there where he clashed with William Harbutt Dawson, the great English expert on Germany. Harold Nicolson's diary entry for 22 January 1919 also records:

Crowe is cantankerous about Cyprus and will not allow me even to mention the subject. I explain (1) that we acquired it by a trick as disreputable as that by which the Italians collared the Dodecanese. (2) that it is wholly Greek, and that under any interpretation of self-determination would opt for union with Greece. (3) that it is of no use to us strategically or economically. (4) that we are left in a false moral position if we ask everyone else to surrender possessions in terms of self-determination and surrender nothing ourselves. How can we keep Cyprus and express moral indignation at the Italians retaining Rhodes? He says, ‘Nonsense, my dear Nicolson. You are not being clear-headed. You think that you are being logical and sincere. You are not. Would you apply self-determination to India, Egypt, Malta and Gibraltar? If you are not prepared to go as far as this, then you have no right to claim that you are logical. If you are prepared to go as far as this, then you had better return to London.’ Dear Crowe – he has the most truthful brain of any man I know.

Whilst Crowe had been an implacable opponent of appeasement towards Germany, he also doubted the French government's motives and sincerity at the Paris Peace Conference, regarding the French as more interested in revenge than a lasting peace. He also regarded the League of Nations Mandates over Danzig, with Poland having special rights in a German-populated city, as a 'house of cards that would not stand'. Crowe was sceptical of the usefulness of the League of Nations and in a memorandum of 12 October 1916, he said that a solemn league would be like other treaties, and asked: "What is there to ensure that it will not, like other treaties, be broken?" Crowe was also sceptical on whether the pledge of common action against breakers of the peace would be honoured. Crowe thought that the balance of power and the considerations of national interest would determine how individual states decided their future actions. Crowe argued that boycotts and blockades, as advocated by the League of Nations, would not be of any use: "It is all a question of real military preponderance" in numbers, cohesion, efficiency and geographical location of each state. Universal disarmament, Crowe also argued, would be a practical impossibility.

Crowe was Permanent Under-Secretary at the Foreign Office from 1920 until his death in 1925.

He was appointed Companion of the Order of the Bath (CB) in 1907, Knight Commander of the Order of St Michael and St George (KCMG) in 1911, Knight Commander of the Order of the Bath (KCB) in 1917, Knight Grand Cross of the Order of St Michael and St George (GCMG) in the 1920 New Year Honours, and Knight Grand Cross of the Order of the Bath (GCB) in the 1923 Birthday Honours.

== Personal life ==
Crowe married in Berlin on 2 February 1903 his widowed maternal first cousin Clema Gerhardt, widow of Eberhardt von Bonin. She was a niece of Henning von Holtzendorff, who was to become the Chief of the German Naval Staff in the First World War. Due to being half-German and having other German connections, Crowe was often attacked in the press during the First World War, especially by Christabel Pankhurst and William le Queux.

== Legacy ==
Stanley Baldwin called Crowe "our ablest public servant". Lord Vansittart in his memoirs said of him: "...a dowdy, meticulous, conscientious agnostic with small faith in anything but his brain and his Britain". Sir Ivone Kirkpatrick said Crowe was:

...probably the most efficient public servant ever produced by the Foreign Office. His mother was German, he spoke with a guttural accent and he had a mind of truly Germanic clarity and orderliness. No-one since his time has ever kept so tight a grip on the work of the whole office. He read a copy of every inward and outward telegram (there were fewer in those days) and sent his marginal notes on them by urgent box to the appropriate department. He sometimes telephoned to juniors to make known his views or his disapproval. I was paralysed one day to pick up the telephone to hear his voice: ‘I have just r-r-read your minute. Either you do not mean what you say, in which case you are wasting my time. Or you do mean it, in which case you are wr-r-riting r-r-rot.’ And with that he put down the receiver. Crowe's industry was prodigious. In December 1921 Lord Curzon asked for the office perspective on Anglo-French relations. Crowe regarded this as a suitable holiday task for himself, and on our return from the Christmas holidays we found a 20,000-word manuscript memorandum in his inimitable limpid style. It was unfortunate for Crowe that he should have served under a chief who never appreciated his quality and who was apt to take advantage of his zeal. The work which Curzon heaped on his willing shoulders probably accelerated his premature death whilst still in harness.

A. J. P. Taylor claimed "Crowe always thought he knew better than his political superiors".

Zara Steiner and Keith Neilson have described Crowe as "the leading German expert in the pre-war Foreign Office... He was a master of detail but also interested in the broader complex of international and military relations... Crowe was the arch anti-appeaser. With ruthless logic and in a forthright manner, he opposed every effort to come to terms with Berlin... A prodigious worker, Crowe's knowledge and skill earned him a very special place in the Foreign Office hierarchy and his comments were read with attention if not always with approval".

== In popular culture ==
In the 2014 BBC mini-series 37 Days, Crowe is portrayed by actor Nicholas Farrell. Crowe is depicted as a competent and shrewd administrator but one who is exasperated and confused by the Foreign Secretary's (Sir Edward Grey; portrayed by Ian McDiarmid) superior diplomatic prowess. The narrator of the series, a Second Division Clerk in the Foreign Office (portrayed by actor James McArdle), also describes Crowe as: "German born, educated in Berlin, but...more British than any one of us".

== Notes ==
Preceded by Lord Hardinge of Penshurst	Permanent Under-Secretary for Foreign Affairs; 1920 – 1925	Succeeded by William Tyrrell
