= Joseph Crowe =

Joseph Crowe may refer to:

- Joseph Petrus Hendrik Crowe (1826–1876), South African recipient of the Victoria Cross
- Joseph Archer Crowe (1825–1896), English consular official and art critic

== See also ==
- Joseph Crow (disambiguation)
