= John Crowe =

John Crowe may refer to:

- John Crowe Ransom (1888–1974), American poet, essayist, social and political theorist, man of letters, and academic
- John James Crowe (1876–1965), English recipient of the Victoria Cross
- Jack Crowe (born 1947), head football coach at the University of Arkansas
- John Henry Crowe (born 1943), physiologist at the University of California, Davis
- John H. Crowe III, game designer for Pagan Publishing
- John Crowe (Canadian politician) (1784–1878), Nova Scotia politician
- John Finley Crowe (1787–1860), Presbyterian minister and founder of Hanover College, Hanover, Indiana
- John Rice Crowe (1795–1877), English businessman and diplomat
- Dean John Crowe (-1955), Dean Crowe, Irish Catholic priest based in Athlone

== See also ==
- John Crow (disambiguation)
