= Pine Mills, Texas =

- Unincorporated community
- Location within Texas Location within the United States
- Coordinates: 32°44′29″N 95°17′22″W
- Country: United States
- State: Texas
- County: Wood
- Elevation: 463 ft (141 m)
- Time zone: UTC-6 (Central (CST))
  - Summer (DST): UTC-5 (CDT)
- Area codes: 430, 903
- GNIS feature ID: 1378867

Pine Mills is an unincorporated settlement in Wood County, Texas, United States. According to the Handbook of Texas, only three people lived in the community in 2002.

== History ==
Slightly southeast of Pine Mills' location, a sawmill community named Liberty Hill had been established as early as 1850. As of 1854, the Holly Springs Baptist Church of Christ was meeting at a facility known as the Liberty Hill Meeting House or Liberty Hill Chapel. A pottery manufacturing operation was in the area as early as 1860. In the early 1870s, the community was known by the name Reedsville, allegedly for a local sawmill owner named Richard G. (Dick) Reed. The Pine Mills post office was established in July 1875, and Reed was hired as postmaster. The community's official name was changed at that time from Reedsville to Pine Mills. In 1884, Pine Mills reported a population of 130, two churches, and several businesses including a blacksmith, carpenters, two cotton gins, and several sawmills. The population reached 250 by 1892, and eleven businesses including two physicians were noted. A Church of Christ was organized in the community sometime before 1892. In 1904, the population was noted at 222; by the next year, the majority of the local timber supply had been depleted and the sawmills had left the community. The post office closed in 1907, and the population was near 40 as of 1910. During the 1930s, the community had a few businesses, among them a factory. Honey became a noted cash crop in the area after 1930, and specialty crop farming increased in the area as well. The population had climbed to 80 by 1943. The discovery of the Pine Mills Oilfield in 1949 did not have much effect on the area's declining economy. The population dwindled to 70 by the mid-1960s. It had two churches, several scattered houses, and two businesses, one of which was a sawmill. The local pottery business was established in 1979 and was still in operation in 2002 with only three people living there.

R.A. Walton operated a gristmill in the area in the 1850s. Reed's daughter, Sarah Tennie Reed, married Joseph Shields in 1871, and he later operated the Shields-Lindley sawmill with George Lindley in the Pine Mills to Mount Pisgah road. D.V. Wagoner came to Pine Mills in 1884 and operated a general merchandise store; he was also a dentist and undertaker. Dr. Robert O. Connell came to the community around 1890 and practiced medicine in Pine Mills.

== Geography ==
Pine Mills is located at the intersection of Farm To Market Roads 14, 49, and 312 approximately ten miles southeast of the county seat of Quitman in the southeastern portion of Wood County.

== Education ==
A school was reported to be part of the settlement by 1855. It was still in operation in 1884. During the 1930s, the community was served by the Liberty School district. Today, the community is served by the Quitman Independent School District.
