= Michael Crow =

Michael Crow may refer to:

- Michael M. Crow (born 1955), 16th and current president of Arizona State University
- Michael Crow (journalist), former Scottish political journalist

== See also ==
- Michael Crowe (disambiguation)
