= Joseph Crow =

Joseph Crow may refer to:

- Joseph Fire Crow (1959–2017), Cheyenne flutist
- Joe Medicine Crow (1913–2016), Crow historian

== See also ==
- Joseph Crowe (disambiguation)
