= Pine Mills Oilfield =

Oil field in Wood County, Texas

Coordinates: 32.6989°N 95.24659°W

The Pine Mills Oilfield is an oilfield developed in the late 1940s and early 1950s in Wood County, Texas extending from the townsite of Pine Mills toward US Highway 80 and the settlement of Crow, Texas. J.M. "Julius" DeuPree and F.R. Jackson are credited with being responsible for the initial exploration of the Pine Mills Oil Field. He established the No. 1 Durratt near Pine Mills in 1949. DeuPree and Jackson were aided by L.A. Warren a land man for Sohio.

DeuPree and Jackson announced two test wells in late September and early October, 1949. By this time the October 3 Wood County Record went to press, an official at First National Bank of Mineola estimated that approximately $300,000 in lease and royalty buying had been unleashed by the fact that oil flowed from the area's first discovery well.

The No. 1 Duratt was gauged at 168 barrels per day as of October 6, 1949. Production was from top of pay at 4,793', the total depth of the well was 4,801 feet, and the elevation was 433 feet. The well was in the sub-Clarksville sand.

The No. 1 Duratt set off exploration over a wider portion of the field. Mineral rights were leased from Pine Mills to US Highway 80 west of Crow and all the way to the Pine Mills townsite. The first wells in the area were going to be allowed to flow 100 barrels per day for thirty days a month.

The second producing well in the Pine Mills Field was the Schio No. 1 Gordon Turner, and the well was reported to have struck approximately 22 feet of oil bearing sand the last week of October, 1949.

The Pine Mills field continued its expansion and, early in 1951, the initial wildcat test well in the S. Holman Survey was done approximately a mile west of the Pine Mills Field, and reached oil in March 1951, extending the size of the field. The test well was believed to have cut in to a fault running north–south parallel to the Pine Mills Field fault. In April 1951, the B.B. Orr No. 1 Childress extension well in the Pine Mills Field struck oil.
