= Henry Crowe =

Henry Crowe may refer to:

- Henry Crowe (RAF officer) (1897–1983), World War I flying ace
- Henry Crowe (vicar) (1769–1851), English vicar and early animal rights writer
- Henry Pierson Crowe (1899–1991), U.S. Marine field grade officer
- Henry Woodfall Crowe (1832–1865), British-Norwegian interpreter, translator, and author
