= Tom Crowe (footballer) =

Australian rules footballer

Personal information
- Full name: Thomas Leo Crowe
- Born: 3 October 1880; Carlton, Victoria
- Died: 3 August 1914 (aged 33); Heatherton, Victoria
- Original team: Carlton Juniors

Playing career^{1}
Years	Club	Games (Goals)
1902	St Kilda	3 (0)
- ^{1} Playing statistics correct to the end of 1902.

Thomas Leo Crowe (3 October 1880 – 3 August 1914) was an Australian rules footballer who played with St Kilda in the Victorian Football League (VFL).
