= Crow, Texas =

- Unincorporated community
- Location within Texas Location within the United States
- Coordinates: 32°36′57″N 95°18′35″W
- Country: United States
- State: Texas
- County: Wood
- Elevation: 345 ft (105 m)
- Time zone: UTC-6 (Central (CST))
  - Summer (DST): UTC-5 (CDT)
- Area codes: 430 & 903
- GNIS feature ID: 1378188

Crow is an unincorporated community in Wood County, Texas, United States. According to the Handbook of Texas, Crow had a population of 25 in 2000.

== History ==
Crow was originally named Graham when the Texas and Pacific Railway built a station in the area in 1876.

The Pine Mills Oilfield operates in the community.

The residents of Crow have held an annual Fourth of July picnic for over a century.

== Geography ==
Crow is located at the intersection of U.S. Highway 80 and Farm to Market Road 778 on the Missouri Pacific Railroad, 14 mi (23 km) southeast of Quitman in southeastern Wood County.

== Education ==
Crow had its own school in 1910. In 1932, it had 88 students enrolled and hosted nine grade levels. It closed in 1960. Today, the community is served by the Hawkins Independent School District.
