= Cosmopolitan Club =

Cosmopolitan Club may refer to:

- Cosmopolitan Club (Chennai), golf course in India
- Cosmopolitan Club (Coimbatore), club in India
- Cosmopolitan Club (London), club active 1852–1902 in England
- Cosmopolitan Club (New York City), private club in United States
- Cosmopolitan Club of Philadelphia, women's club in United States
- Cosmopolitan Club (rugby), French rugby club for which Gaston Lane (1883–1914) played

== See also ==
- List of Cosmopolitan Clubs for information about other organisations of the same name
