= USS Vencedor =

Patrol vessel of the United States Navy

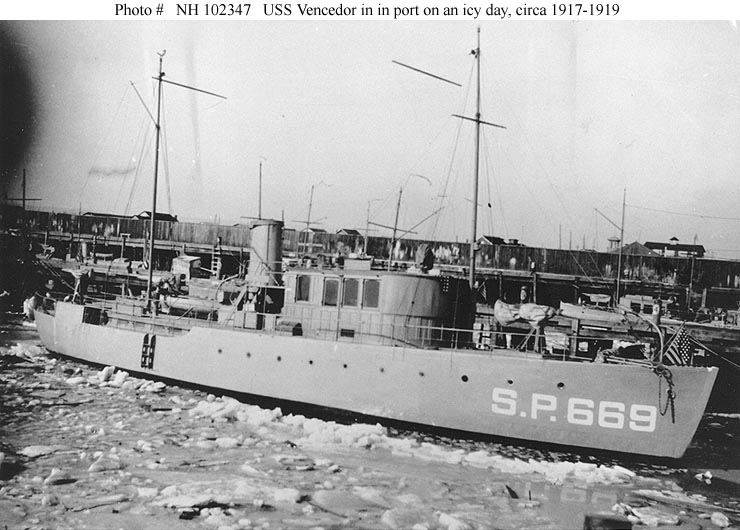
- USS Vencedor (SP-669) in an icy port during World War I.

History

United States
- Name: USS Vencedor
- Namesake: Previous name retained
- Builder: George Lawley & Son, Neponset, Massachusetts
- Completed: 1909
- Acquired: 19 June 1917
- Commissioned: 30 August 1917
- Decommissioned: 26 February 1919
- Fate: Returned to owner 25 or 26 February 1919
- Notes: Operated as private motorboat Tekla and Vencedor 1909-1917 and Vencedor from 1919

General characteristics
- Type: Patrol vessel
- Tonnage: 90 gross register tons
- Length: 90 ft (27 m)
- Beam: 17 ft (5.2 m)
- Draft: 3 ft 11 in (1.19 m) mean
- Speed: 10.5 knots
- Complement: 15
- Armament: 1 × 6-pounder gun; 1 × 1-pounder gun

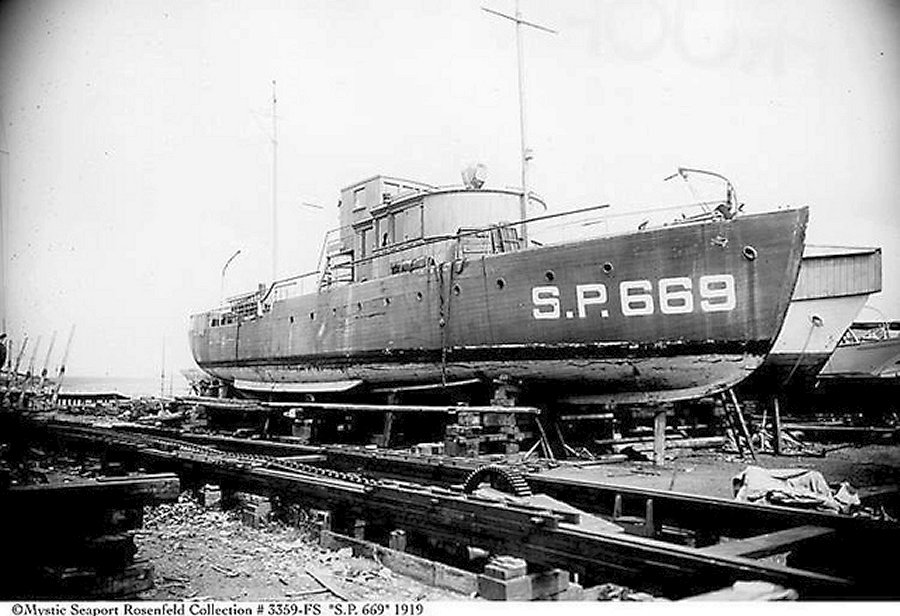
Vencedor once again under private ownership on 13 July 1919, hauled out of the water at City Island in the Bronx, New York. Although decommissioned and returned to her owner in February 1919, she still bears her U.S. Navy "S.P. 669" section patrol marking on her bow.

USS Vencedor (SP-669) was a United States Navy patrol vessel in commission from 1917 to 1918.

Vencedor was built as the private motorboat Tekla by George Lawley & Son at Neponset, Massachusetts, in 1909. She later was renamed Vencedor.

On 19 June 1917, the U.S. Navy acquired Vencedor under a free lease from her owner, Herbert H. Luedinghaus, for use as a section patrol boat during World War I. She was commissioned at the New York Navy Yard in Brooklyn, New York, as USS Vencedor (SP-669) on 30 August 1917.

Assigned to the 3rd Naval District and operating from Section Base No. 6, Vencedor carried out harbor patrol duties into the summer of 1918. She then changed roles and began towing targets and operating as a dispatch boat for the rest of World War I.

Vencedor was decommissioned at City Island in the Bronx, New York, on 26 February 1919 and returned to Luedinghaus. Sources differ on the date of her return to Luedinghams, stating both 25 and 26 February 1919 as the date of her return; the 25 February 1919 return date calls into question the accuracy of the 26 February decommissioning date claimed for her, as decommissioning presumably would occur before or simultaneously with her return to her owner.
