= David Crowe (software engineer) =

American businessman

- Born: 7 June 1966
- Occupation(s): Businessman and software engineer

David K. Crowe (born 7 June 1966) is an American businessman and software engineer. He is the President of Tucson Embedded Systems, Inc.

== Personal life ==
David Crowe was born in Yuma, AZ on June 7, 1966. He moved to Tucson, AZ to attend the University of Arizona. He graduated in 1989 with a B.S. in Electrical and Computer Engineering. He is married with two children.

== Professional career ==
From 1990 to 1994, Crowe worked as a Software Engineer for E-Systems. While working there, he also co-founded The Software Firm, Inc., in order to "design and develop MS Windows based database applications." In 2010, Crowe was appointed to the Board of Directors of the Arizona Technology Council, a not-for-profit trade association providing support to the state's technology industry.

== Tucson Embedded Systems ==
Crowe co-founded Tucson Embedded Systems in 1998. TES offers a variety of engineering and manufacturing services for commercial and military industries. In addition to serving as President of the company, Crowe has continued his work in "development, support, testing, and verification of flight critical embedded systems. "

Under Crowe's leadership, TES has been named:

2007-2010 Inc. Magazine 5000 fastest growing companies in the US

2006 Minority/Technology Company of the Year in Southern Arizona

TES has sponsored several student projects from the University of Arizona, and Crowe himself has been recognized as a supporter of the College of Engineering

== US Senate seat ==
David Crowe, a Democrat, explored a run for the US Senate seat held by Republican Jon Kyl, who stated that he would not seek reelection in 2012. Crowe's exploratory campaign emphasis was on job creation and education, specifically with regards to the tech industry
