= Samuel Crowell =

Samuel Crowell was a ship-captain and fur trader in the late 18th century on the Pacific Northwest Coast. Crowell was master of the Hancock, a brig owned by Messrs. Crowell, Joseph Cordis of Charlestown and Edward Jones of Boston, according to Boston Ship Registers (Mary Malloy) which left Boston in November 1790 and arrived on the Northwest Coast in July of the following year, spending a good time of the season trading in the area of the Queen Charlotte Islands. Crowell and his men built the first European-type vessel to be constructed on the Charlottes, a tender for the Hancock, doing so on Maast Island which lies off the native village of Masset. Crowell and his vessel are believed to have been the first non-indigenous vessel to penetrate Masset Sound. Crowell and the Hancock sailed to China in the fall of 1791 and, after selling her cargo of furs there, returned twice more to the Islands, in 1792 and 1793.

Crowell Rock, near Moresby Island in the southern Queen Charlottes, and Crowell Point, near Masset, are named after him. Hancock Point, also on southern Moresby, was named for his ship.

== See also ==
- Old China Trade
