= Nick Crowe =

Nick Crowe may refer to:

- Nick Crowe (artist) (born 1968), English artist
- Nick Crowe (sidecar racer), British sidecar racer
