= Eyre Evans Crowe =

English journalist and historian

Eyre Evans Crowe (1799 – February 25, 1868) was an English journalist and historian.

== Life ==
The son of an Army officer of Anglo-Irish ancestry, Crowe was born in Southampton and educated at Trinity College, Dublin. In the 1820s he turned to writing novels: Vittoria Colonna, To-Day in Ireland (1825), The English in Italy (1825), Yesterday in Ireland (1829), and The English at Home (1830). In the early 1820s he became a regular contributor to Blackwood's Magazine. Alongside American John Neal, he was one of two to exhibit the publisher's desired style notably well. Crowe commenced his work as a writer for the London newspaper press as Paris correspondent for the Morning Chronicle in 1832, and he afterwards became a leading contributor to The Examiner and the Daily News. Of the latter journal he was principal editor for some time previous to his death.

The department he specially cultivated was that of continental history and foreign politics. He published Lives of Foreign Statesmen (1830), The Greek and the Turk (1853), and Reigns of Louis XVIII. and Charles X. (1854). These were followed by his most important work, the History of France (5 vols., 1858–1868). It was founded upon original sources, in order to consult which the author resided for a considerable time in Paris.

== Family ==
Among his children were Eyre Crowe (1824–1910), Sir Joseph Archer Crowe (1825–1896), and George Crowe (1840–1889), husband of the actress Kate Bateman.

Media offices
Preceded by John Forster	Editor of the Daily News; 1847–1851	Succeeded by Frederick Knight Hunt
