= Thomas Walker (journalist) =

English journalist (1822–1898)

Thomas Walker (1822–1898) was an English journalist, known as the editor of The Daily News.

== Life ==
Walker was born on 5 February 1822 in Marefair, Northampton, and his parents sent him to an academy in the Horse Market at the age of six, where he remained till 10: the headmaster was James Harris. His father died when he was young, and his mother accepted the offer of relatives at Oxford to take charge of him. He was taught carpentering there in the workshop of a Mr. Smith. At the close of his apprenticeship he began business with a Mr. Lee; but he had decided to become a journalist.

Having learned shorthand, in September 1846 Walker advertised in The Times for a job. T. P. Healey, proprietor of the Medical Times, took Walker on as reporter; he wrote also for Eliza Cook's Journal. Having met Frederick Knight Hunt, assistant-editor of the Daily News, he wrote for the News, and then obtained a junior post on the editorial staff, working under Joseph Archer Crowe. In 1851 he became foreign and general sub-editor. On the death of William Weir in 1858 he was appointed to the editorship, becoming known as a supporter of Italian nationalism, and by his confidence in the ultimate victory of the Union in the American Civil War; under the influence of Harriet Martineau he became a staunch advocate of the cause of the North.

Walker resigned the editorship in 1869 to accept the charge of the London Gazette; and retired on 31 July 1889, when the office of editor was suppressed there. He died on 16 February 1898 at his residence in Addison Road, Kensington, and was buried on 20 February in Brompton cemetery. Frederick Greenwood wrote in the Pall Mall Gazette of his "great political candour". He was a close student of the philosophy of Thomas Brown, and active as a congregationalist.

== Family ==
Walker was twice married, and a daughter survived him.

== Notes ==
Attribution

This article incorporates text from a publication now in the public domain: Lee, Sidney, ed. (1899). "Walker, Thomas (1822-1898)". Dictionary of National Biography. Vol. 59. London: Smith, Elder & Co.
