= Peggy Crowe =

American speed skater

Personal information
- Birth name: Margaret Ann Crowe
- Born: January 15, 1956; St. Louis, Missouri, U.S.
- Died: February 9, 2012 (aged 56); Beaverton, Oregon, U.S.

Sport
- Sport: Speed skating

Achievements and titles
- Olympic finals: 1976

Peggy Crowe (January 15, 1956 – February 9, 2012) was an American speed skater. She competed at the 1976 Winter Olympics.
