= Joseph Archer Crowe =

English journalist, consular official and art historian (1825–1896)

Sir Joseph Archer Crowe
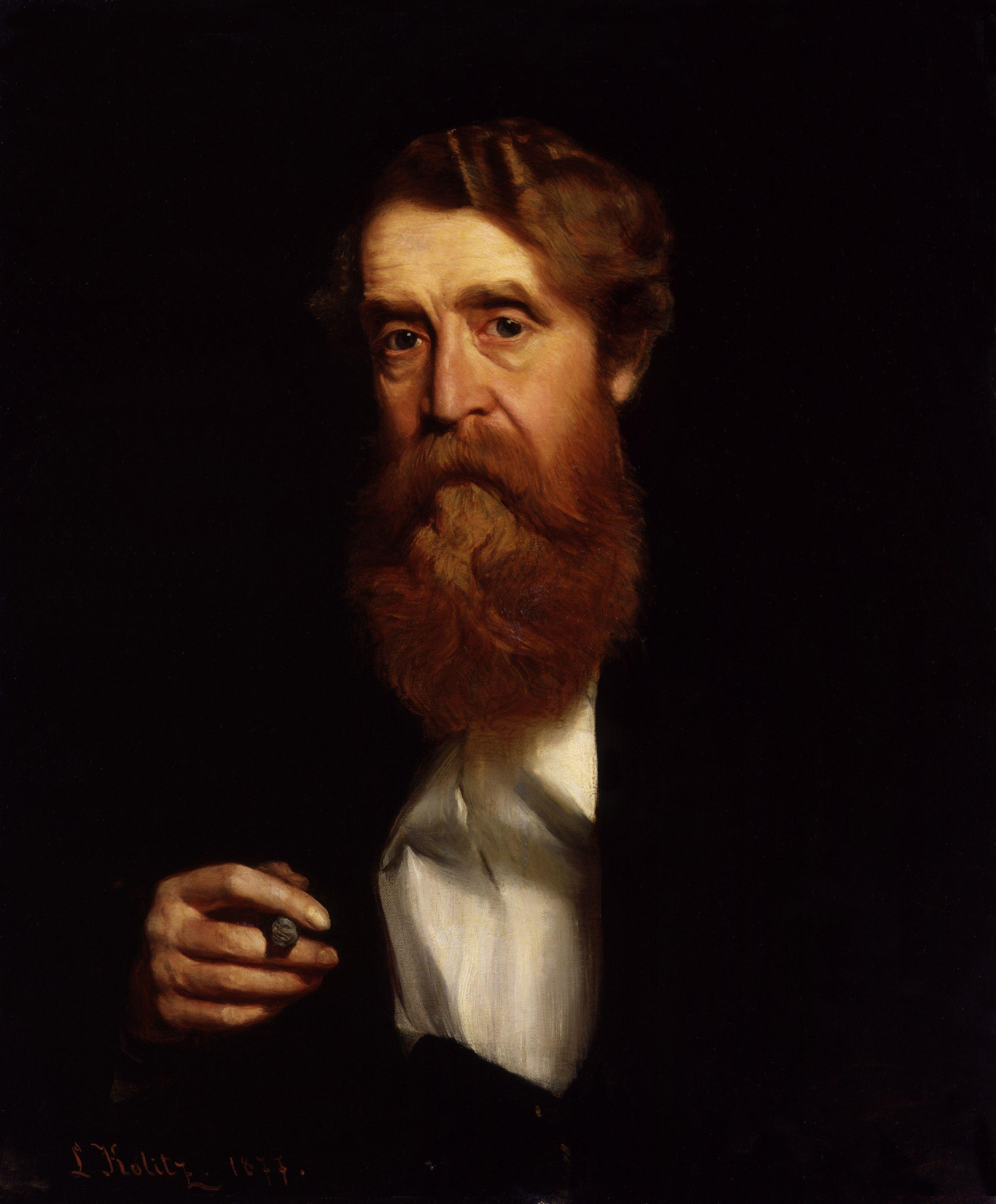
- Sir Joseph Archer Crowe by Louis Kolitz
- Born: 25 October 1825; London, England
- Died: 6 September 1896 (aged 70); Werbach, Germany
- Occupations: Journalist; diplomat; art historian

Sir Joseph Archer Crowe KCMG (25 October 1825, London – 6 September 1896, Gamburg an der Tauber, today Werbach, Germany) was an English journalist, consular official and art historian, whose volumes of the History of Painting in Italy, co-written with the Italian critic Giovanni Battista Cavalcaselle (1819–1897), stand at the beginning of disciplined modern art history writing in English, being based on chronologies of individual artists' development and the connoisseurship of identifying artist's individual manners or "hands".

Their multi-volume A New History of Painting in Italy continued to be revised and republished until 1909, after both were dead. Though now outdated, these are still often cited by modern art historians.

== Life ==
=== Early life ===
Crowe was born at 141 Sloane Street, London, the son of the journalist Eyre Evans Crowe and his wife Margaret Archer. Shortly after his birth the family moved to France, where Crowe's childhood was spent, mostly in Paris, where his father was based as the correspondent of the London Morning Chronicle; his home was the centre of a liberal and artistic circle that mixed French and expatriates.

At an early age Crowe showed considerable aptitude for painting and entered the studio of Paul Delaroche in Paris, with his brother Eyre Crowe, who was to become a painter of historical genre subjects, and the friend and amanuensis of William Makepeace Thackeray.

=== Journalism ===
He returned to England with his father in 1843, following him into journalism as a correspondent for the Morning Chronicle and the Daily News.

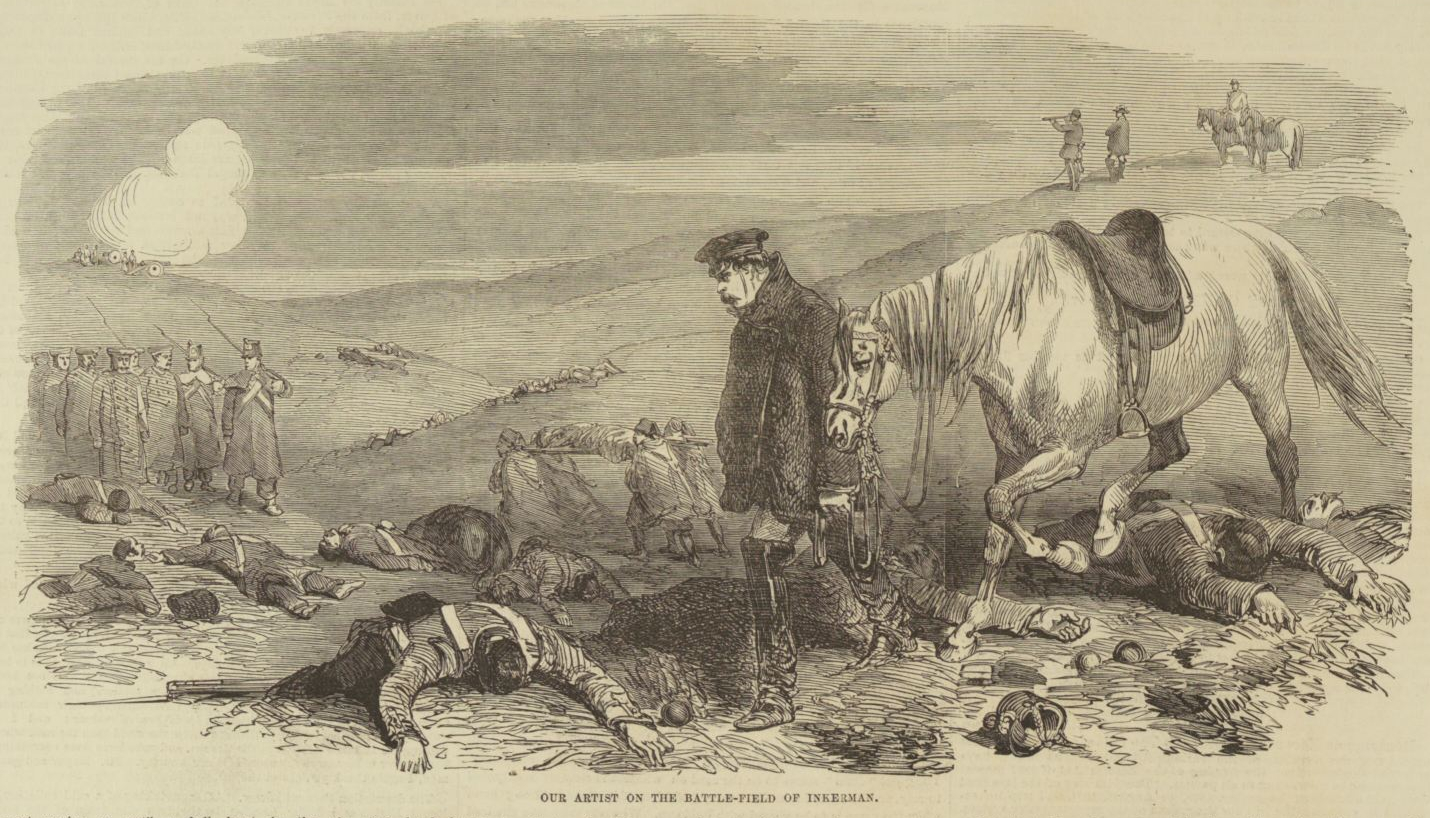
Crowe on the Battlefield of Inkerman in 1854

During the Crimean War he worked as a correspondent for the Illustrated London News. On his return from the Crimea he received an offer to direct an art school in India. He went there, but when the post did not materialise he turned to journalism again, acting as a correspondent for the Times during the Indian Mutiny. Illness cut his time in India short, and he returned to England. He was a correspondent for the Times during the Austro-Italian War in 1858, and was present at the battle of Solferino.

=== Diplomatic career ===
Through the influence of Lord John Russell, Crowe was appointed consul-general for Saxony in 1860, and in this capacity he represented French interests at Leipzig during the Franco-Prussian War in 1870. In 1872 he was appointed consul-general for Westphalia and the Rhenish Provinces in Düsseldorf and in 1880 commercial attaché to the embassies at Berlin and Vienna. In 1882 he was promoted to be commercial attaché for the whole of Europe, based in Paris. In 1883 he was secretary to the Danube Conference in London; in 1889 plenipotentiary at the Samoa Conference in Berlin and in 1890 British envoy at the Telegraph Congress in Paris. For these services he was created a C.B. on 14 March 1885, and K.C.M.G on 21 May 1890.

=== Art historical writing ===
In 1846, at the suggestion of his father, Crowe began to collect materials for a history of the early Flemish painters. The next year, while travelling between Berlin and Vienna, Crowe made a chance acquaintance with a young Italian art student, Giovanni Battista Cavalcaselle. This acquaintance was renewed later, and cemented into friendship in London, where Cavalcaselle had fled as a political refugee. They decided to collaborate on the work on Flemish painters, which Crowe had in hand. They visited collections and searched manuscripts together, and no detail was decided until it had been fully debated between them. The text itself was written by Crowe. They went on to collaborate on histories of Italian painting, and monographs on Titian and Raphael.

=== Family ===
Crowe married Asta von Barby (c.1841-1908), daughter of Baron Gustav von Barby and Eveline von Ribbentrop, in Gotha, Germany, 11 April 1861. They had three sons, including Sir Eyre Crowe and four daughters.

=== Death ===
He died at Schloss Gamburg in Franconia on 6 September 1896.

=== Biography ===
A recent book in italian is the first to study him: Valentina Conticelli, Joseph Archer Crowe storico dell'arte (1825-1896), Edizioni Palumbi, Teramo 2023.

== Publications ==
With Cavacaselle:

- J. A. Crowe and G. B. Cavalcaselle (1857). The Early Flemish Painters: Notices of their Lives and Works. Albemarle Street, London: John Murray.
- Joseph Archer Crowe and Giovanni Battista Cavalcaselle (1909). Edward Hutton (ed.). A New History of Painting in Italy, from the Second to the Sixteenth Century, Volume II of three volumes: The Sienese school of the XIVth century; The Florentine School of the XVth century. JM Dent (London) and EP Dutton (New York).
- Joseph Archer Crowe and Giovanni Battista Cavalcaselle (1912). Tancred Borenius (ed.). A History of Painting in North Italy, Venice, Padua, Vicenza, Verona, Ferrara, Milan, Friuli, Brescia, from the Fourteenth to the Sixteenth Century, Volume 1 (no preview). Albemarle Street, London: John Murray.
- Joseph Archer Crowe and Giovanni Battista Cavalcaselle (1871). A History of Painting in North Italy, Venice, Padua, Vicenza, Verona, Ferrara, Milan, Friuli, Brescia, from the Fourteenth to the Sixteenth Century, Volume 2. Albemarle Street, London: John Murray.
- Titian: his Life and Times (in two volumes, 1877)
- Raphael: his Life and Works (in two volumes 1883–5)

Crowe also edited Jakob Burckhardt's Cicerone, or Art Guide to Painting in Italy (1873-9), and Kugler's Handbook of Painting: the German, Flemish, and Dutch Schools (1874).

In 1865 he published an autobiography, Reminiscences of Thirty-five Years of my Life.

Crowe and Cavalcaselle's History of Painting was under revision by Crowe up to the time of his death, and then by Sandford Arthur Strong (died 1904) and Robert Langton Douglas, who brought out first and second volumes of Murray's new six-volume edition in 1903; the third volume, edited by Langton Douglas, appeared in 1909. A reprint of the original edition, brought up to date by annotations by Edward Hutton, was published by Dent in three volumes in 1909.

== Sources ==
Attribution:

- This article incorporates text from a publication now in the public domain: Cust, Lionel Henry (1901). "Crowe, Joseph Arthur". In Lee, Sidney (ed.). Dictionary of National Biography (1st supplement). London: Smith, Elder & Co.
