= Henry Crowe (vicar) =

English clergyman and writer (1769–1851)

The Reverend Henry Crowe
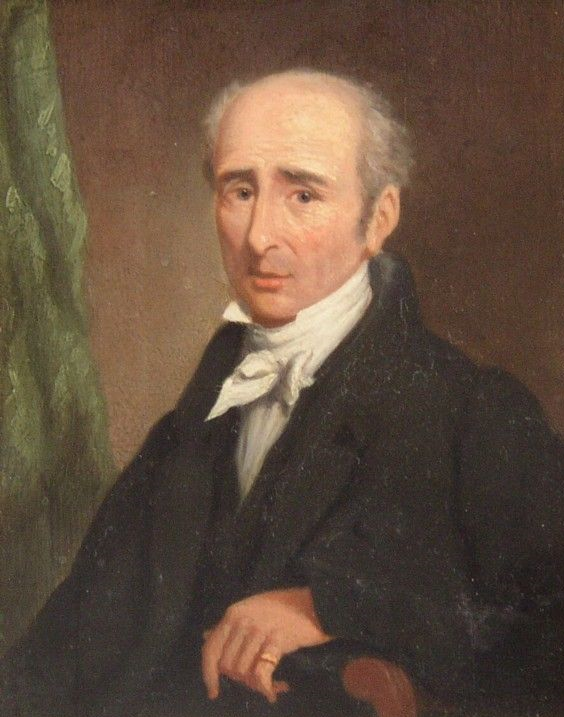
- 1829 portrait by Edvardo Kilvert
- Born: 14 March 1769; Stoke Ferry, England
- Died: 18 December 1851 (aged 82); Hatton Garden, London, England
- Education: Gonville and Caius College, Cambridge (B.A., 1790); Clare College (M.A., 1794)
- Occupations: Clergyman, writer

Henry Crowe (14 March 1769 – 18 December 1851) was an English Anglican clergyman and early animal rights writer.

== Biography ==
Henry Crowe was born at Stoke Ferry, Norfolk, the son of the Rev. Henry Crowe, Rector of Burnham Deepdale. After schooling in Norwich, he matriculated at Gonville and Caius College, Cambridge in 1786, graduating B.A. in 1790. He was a Fellow of Clare College (1793–1800) and obtained his M.A. in 1794.

Crowe was ordained deacon on 5 December 1791 and priest on 26 May 1793. He was vicar of Buckingham (1810–1851). He died at Hatton Garden in 1851, age 82.

== Zoophilos ==
Crowe was the author of the book Zoophilos, published in 1819. It was an early work supportive of animal welfare and criticised the mistreatment of animals such as bullbaiting, cockfighting, and bearbaiting. He also criticised methods of animal slaughter and types of animal experimentation and testing. Crowe opposed vivisection and his book contains the chapter, "On Cruelty in Philosophical Researches" which compares vivisectional cruelties to the inquisition. He was an opponent of field sports, especially hunting.

There were positive reviews of Crowe's book published in The Gentleman's Magazine (1819) and The Monthly Review (1820).

== Publications ==
- Zoophilos, Or, Considerations on the Moral Treatment of Inferior Animals (1819)
- Animadversions on Cruelty to the Brute Creation (1825)

== See also ==
- Christianity and animal rights
- History of animal rights
