= Michael Crowe =

Michael Crowe may refer to:

- Michael Crowe, teenager falsely accused of the murder of his sister, see Murder of Stephanie Crowe
- Michael Crowe (footballer) (born 1995), footballer representing Wales internationally
- Michael Crowe (field hockey) (born 1942), British Olympic hockey player
- Michael J. Crowe (born 1936), University of Notre Dame historian and writer

== See also ==
- Michael Crow (disambiguation)
