= Christopher Crowe =

Christopher or Chris Crowe may refer to:

- Chris Crowe (footballer) (1939–2003), English footballer
- Chris Crowe (author), American academic and young-adult author
- Christopher Crowe (screenwriter), screenwriter and television producer
- Christopher Crowe (diplomat) (c. 1681–1749), English consul and landowner
- Christopher Crowe, one of several aliases used by Christian Gerhartsreiter (born 1961), German imposter and convicted murderer; this name was deliberately chosen to imitate the name of the Alfred Hitchcock Presents director
