= Frederick Knight Hunt =

English journalist and author

Frederick Knight Hunt (1814–1854) was an English journalist and author, known for The Fourth Estate, a history of journalism.

== Life ==
Hunt was born in Buckinghamshire, to a humble family background. At the time of his father's death, around 1830, Hunt was a night boy in a printer's office; to support his family, he took on a day job as a clerk to a barrister, who gave him an introduction to a morning newspaper. He also studied medicine, at the North London School of Medicine, and qualified as a member of the Royal College of Surgeons, in 1840.

In 1839 Hunt founded the Medical Times, initially edited by Robert Knox. Hunt, however, made little from it, and had to sell, to T. P. Healey, in 1841. There were reasons concerning family and money troubles. Another motivation, however, for his exit was an embroilment in libel matters, after he defended John Elliotson in his paper. He then took a post as a surgeon to a poor law union in Norfolk. The Medical Times was incorporated in January 1852 with the Medical Gazette, and continued as the Medical Times and Gazette until 1885.

After a year Hunt returned to London, continuing to practise medicine, and working briefly for the Anti-Corn Law League. He also resumed his connection with the press. He was successively sub-editor of the Illustrated London News, and editor of the Pictorial Times.

Hunt wrote for Household Words, edited by Charles Dickens, contributing in particular on anatomical exhibitions. On the establishment of the Daily News in 1846, he was selected by Dickens as one of the assistant editors. In 1851 he was made chief editor, and under him the paper first became prosperous. He took on there as assistant editor Thomas Walker, a walk-in acquaintance from 1846, at one of his surgeries. Other recruits were Edwin Lawrence Godkin, sent to the Ottoman Empire, and Harriet Martineau as a leader writer, who became a prolific contributor.

Hunt died of typhus fever, 18 November 1854.

== Works ==
Hunt's major work was The Fourth Estate: Contributions towards a History of Newspapers and of the Liberty of the Press, 1850, a history of the English press. It gives details on legislative impediments to journalism; and chapters on the economy of newspaper offices in the writer's own day. He also wrote:

- The Rhine: its scenery & historical & legendary associations (1845)
- The Book of Art, Cartoons, Frescoes, Sculpture and Decorative Art, as Applied to the New Houses of Parliament and to Buildings in General, with an Historical Notice of the Exhibitions in Westminster Hall and Directions for Painting in Fresco (1846), editor.
