= Mariesa Crow =

American electrical engineer (born 1963)

- Born: Mariesa Louise Crow; 1963 (age 62–63)
- Education: University of Michigan (BS); University of Illinois Urbana-Champaign (MS, PhD)
- Occupations: Electrical engineer, Professor Emerita
- Employer: Missouri University of Science and Technology
- Known for: Electric power systems, Smart grid, Microgrids, Power electronics
- Title: Fred W. Finley Distinguished Professor Emerita
- Awards: IEEE Fellow; IEEE PES Outstanding Engineering Educator Award (2016); President’s Award for Leadership (2014)
- Website: news.mst.edu/tag/mariesa-crow/

Mariesa Louise Crow (born 1963) is an American retired electrical engineer and academic who was the Fred W. Finley Distinguished Professor of Electrical and Computer Engineering Emeritus and the vice provost for research at the Missouri University of Science and Technology. Her research contributions include works on energy storage, microgrids, and their applications in renewable energy systems.

== Education and career ==
Crow was born in 1963, the daughter of Lowell Crow, a US Army specialist, electrical engineer, and business professor at Western Michigan University. She majored in electrical engineering as an undergraduate at the University of Michigan, graduating in 1985. She earned a master's degree and Ph.D. in electrical engineering from the University of Illinois Urbana-Champaign, in 1986 and 1989 respectively.

After a year as an assistant professor at Arizona State University, she joined the Missouri University of Science and Technology (then the University of Missouri–Rolla) as a faculty member in 1991. She was promoted to full professor in 2000, and was given the Fred W. Finley Distinguished Professorship in 2006. She became associate dean for research and graduate affairs in engineering in 2001. When the university's School of Mines and Metallurgy was reorganized in 2003, becoming the School of Materials, Energy and Earth Resources, she became its founding dean, serving until 2007. She founded the university's Energy Research and Development Center in 2007, and served as its director until 2012. She became vice provost for research in 2016.

== Research ==
Crow primarily studies energy storage and microgrids. This includes energy storage's application to the bulk power grid and how it can help integrate renewable power sources. She has helped develop small renewable microgrids for military forward operating bases, which usually operate on diesel and gas generators, which have high transportation costs and can be dangerous close to combat. In energy storage, she also studies the use of electric cars as storage devices for the grid. She also contributes to the work by the NSF Center for Future Renewable Electric Energy Delivery and Management (FREEDM) on an "internet of energy" which is intended to allow people to control how and when they get their energy from the grid. In addition to her research, she also works in education.

== Book ==
Crow is the author of a graduate-level textbook, Computational Methods for Electric Power Systems (CRC Press, 2002; 3rd ed., 2016).

== Recognition ==
Crow was named the University of Missouri–Rolla Woman of the Year for 2002, "in recognition of her efforts to improve the campus environment for women and minorities".

She received the IEEE Third Millennium Medal in 2000. She was named an IEEE Fellow in 2010, "for contributions to power engineering education and to computational methods for power system analysis", and in the same year received the IEEE Power & Energy Society Distinguished Service Award. She was the 2016 recipient of the IEEE Power & Energy Society Outstanding Power Engineering Educator Award, "for leadership and innovation in electric power engineering education".

== Personal life ==
Crow is married to James Drewniak, also a professor of electrical engineering at the Missouri University of Science and Technology. Together, they raise alpacas for their fleece on an 8-acre (3 ha) ranch.
