= William Crowe (Dean of Clonfert) =

William Crowe (born 1693) was a Church of Ireland priest in Ireland.

Crowe was born in County Limerick and educated at Trinity College Dublin. The sacrist of Clonfert Cathedral, he was Archdeacon of Clonfert from April 1745 to August 1745; and Dean of Clonfert from then until his resignation in 1766.
