= Barbara Crow =

Canadian sociologist

Dean of Faculty of Arts and Science, Queen's University
- In office July 1, 2017 – August 1, 2024
- Preceded by: Gordon E. Smith (interim)
- Succeeded by: Bob Lemieux (interim)

Associate Vice-President Graduate and Dean of Faculty of Graduate Studies, York University
- In office July 1, 2014 – May 31, 2017
- Preceded by: Barbara Crow (interim)
- Succeeded by: Fahim Quadir (interim)

Personal details
- Spouse: Michael Longford
- Education: York University (BA, MA, PhD)
Barbara Crow
Academic background
- Thesis: Female Mayors in Ontario
- Doctoral advisor: Bernard Blishen
Academic work
- Discipline: Sociology
- Institutions: Queen's University; York University

Barbara Crow is a Canadian sociologist and university administrator. She was the Dean of the Faculty of Arts and Science of Queen's University and a professor at the Department of Sociology.

== Education and career ==
Crow graduated from York University in 1984 with a BA in political science and women's studies, then went on to obtain an MA (in 1986) and a PhD (in 1994) from the same university. She started her career at the University of Calgary, becoming an assistant professor at the Faculty of General Studies in 1993, and was promoted to associate professor at the Faculty of Communication and Culture in 1999. She returned to her alma mater in 2001, having been appointed an associate professor at its Department of Communications in the Faculty of Liberal Arts and Professional Studies and the Technology Enhanced Learning Chair.

From 2009 to 2012, Crow was the Associate Dean Research of the Faculty, and became the Associate Dean, Teaching and Learning in 2012. In the same year, she succeeded Allan Hutchinson, assuming the roles of Associate Vice-President (AVP) Graduate and Dean of Faculty of Graduate Studies on an interim basis. She was officially appointed to these positions in 2014, starting her 5-year term in July that year.

In December 2016, Queen's University announced the appointment of Crow as the new Dean of the Faculty of Arts and Science. She began her 5-year term on July 1, 2017.

== Research ==
Crow's research interests are interdisciplinary, involving the intersection of feminism, aging, and digital technology. She is a co-founder of the Mobile Media Lab, and a co-principal investigator on the Ageing + Communication + Technologies (ACT) Project. She was also the president of the Canadian Women’s Studies Association (name changed to Women’s and Gender Studies et Recherches Féministes in 2010) between 2003 and 2004.

Crow has been the editor of the Canadian Journal of Communication, and some of her edited books include Radical Feminism: A Documentary Reader, Open Boundaries: A Canadian Women's Studies Reader (3rd ed.) and The Wireless Spectrum: The Politics, Practices and Poetics of Mobile Communication.

== Personal life ==
Crow's husband is Michael Longford, an associate professor at the School of Art, Media, Performance and Design, York University. They left a legacy gift in 2015, providing financial support to future York students.

The Barbara Crow Graduate Student Leadership Award at York University is named after Crow.
