= George Crowe (cricketer) =

English cricketer

George Lawson Crowe (8 January 1885 – 23 June 1976) was an English cricketer: a right-handed batsman who made 23 appearances from 1906 to 1913, all for Worcestershire.

Born in Worcester, Crowe attended Westminster School, and achieved a place in the school team in 1903. He made his first-class debut three years later for Worcestershire against Hampshire, scoring 78 in the first innings; this was to remain his highest first-class score, and indeed he made only one more fifty: 56 against the same opponents in 1909. He took only two wickets, one being that of Test player Charlie McGahey.

In retirement Crowe served for many years as a master at Bromley County Grammar School; he died at the age of 91 in that town.
