= Alex Crowe =

Scottish footballer (1924–1997)

Personal information
- Full name: Alexander Allan Crowe
- Date of birth: 24 November 1924
- Place of birth: Motherwell, Scotland
- Date of death: 3 May 1997 (aged 72)
- Place of death: Motherwell, Scotland
- Position: Inside forward

Senior career*
Years	Team	Apps	(Gls)
–	Polkemmet Juniors		
1946–1953	St Mirren	70	(20)
1953–1955	Ipswich Town	50	(9)
–	Stowmarket Town		
- * Club domestic league appearances and goals

Alexander Allan Crowe (24 November 1924 – 3 May 1997) was a Scottish footballer who played as an inside forward. He appeared in the Scottish Football League for St Mirren, and in England's Football League for Ipswich Town. Crowe was heavily involved in Ipswich's promotion to the Second Division as champions of the Third Division South in the 1953–54 season.
