= Brian Crowe =

British diplomat (1938–2020)

Sir Brian Crowe

Ambassador of the United Kingdom to Austria
- In office 1989–1992
- Preceded by: Robert O'Neill
- Succeeded by: Terence Wood

Personal details
- Born: 5 January 1938
- Died: 23 March 2020 (aged 82)
- Relatives: Eyre Crowe (grandfather)
- Education: Magdalen College, Oxford
- Occupation: Diplomat
- Known for: Ambassador to Austria, 1989–1992

Sir Brian Lee Crowe KCMG (5 January 1938 – 23 March 2020) was a British diplomat, who was Ambassador to Austria from 1989 to 1992.

He was born on 5 January 1938, the son of Eric Crowe, a diplomat, and Virginia Teusler. His grandfather was Sir Eyre Crowe. He was educated at Waterkloof House Preparatory School, Sherborne School and Magdalen College, Oxford.

Crowe died on 23 March 2020 due to COVID-19 during the COVID-19 pandemic in England.

== Bibliography ==
- Crowe, Sir Brian (17 October 2005). "A Common European Foreign Policy After Iraq?". In Holland, Martin (ed.). Common Foreign and Security Policy: The First Ten Years 2nd Edition. A&C Black. pp. 28–43. ISBN 978-0-8264-7853-5.
