= Steve Crowe =

Steve orStephen Crowe may refer to:

- Steve Crowe (rugby league) (born 1969), rugby league footballer
- Stephen Crowe (composer), English composer
