= Sam Crow =

Sam Crow may refer to:

- Sam A. Crow (1926–2022), United States federal judge
- Sam Crow (baseball), pre-Negro leagues infielder

== See also ==
- SAMCRO, Sons of Anarchy Motorcycle Club, Redwood Original
