= Dan Crow (musician) =

American musician

Dan Crow is a performer of children's songs. He is best known for performing the theme song ("Walk Outside") of the movie The Adventures of Milo and Otis, but also composed many Disney songs, most significantly for Welcome to Pooh Corner and Dumbo's Circus. He also performed on a Baby Songs spinoff video, and regular appearances on children's educational channels like Noggin and The Learning Channel, as well as his own commercial video and audio recordings.
