= John James Crowe =

- Born: 28 December 1876; Devonport, Devon
- Died: 27 February 1965 (aged 88); Brighton, Sussex
- Military career
- Allegiance: United Kingdom
- Branch: British Army
- Rank: Captain
- Units: The Worcestershire Regiment
- Conflicts: World War I
- Awards: Victoria Cross

Captain John James Crowe VC (28 December 1876 – 27 February 1965) was an English recipient of the Victoria Cross, the highest and most prestigious award for gallantry in the face of the enemy that can be awarded to British and Commonwealth forces.

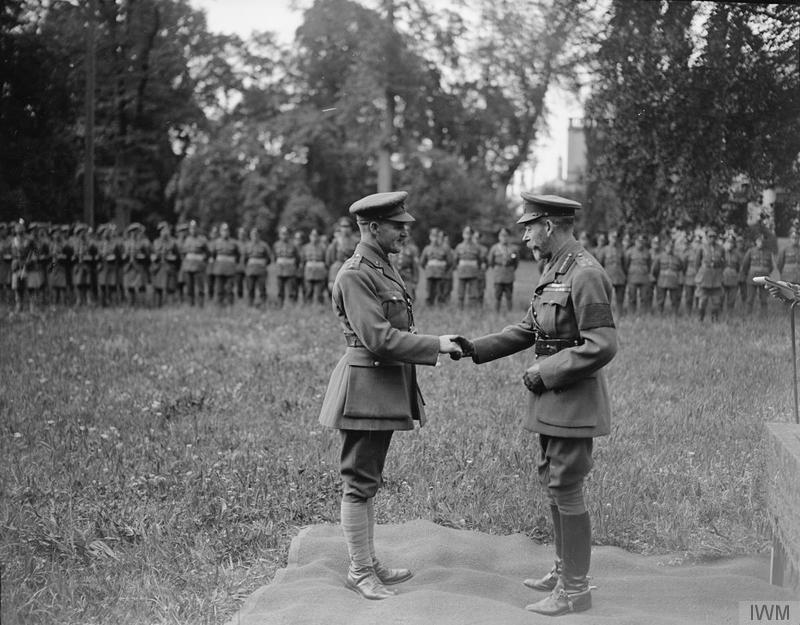
King George V investing Captain John James Crowe of the 2nd Battalion, Worcestershire Regiment with the Victoria Cross at the Second Army Headquarters. Blendecques, 6 August 1918.

Crowe was 41 years old, and a second lieutenant in the 2nd Battalion, The Worcestershire Regiment, British Army during the First World War at the Battle of Lys. On 14 April 1918 at Neuve Eglise, Belgium, when the enemy, having attacked a post in a village, broke past on the high ground and established a machine-gun and snipers, Second Lieutenant Crowe, with two NCOs and seven men twice engaged the enemy who on each occasion withdrew into the village, followed by the lieutenant firing on them. On the second occasion, taking only two men, he attacked two enemy machine-guns killing both gunners and several more of the enemy. The remainder withdrew, allowing him to capture the two guns. His actions during this incident resulted in Crowe being awarded the Victoria Cross.

He later achieved the rank of captain.

His Victoria Cross is displayed at the Worcestershire Regiment Museum in the Worcester City Art Gallery & Museum, Worcester.
