= The Daily News (UK) =

Former British daily newspaper

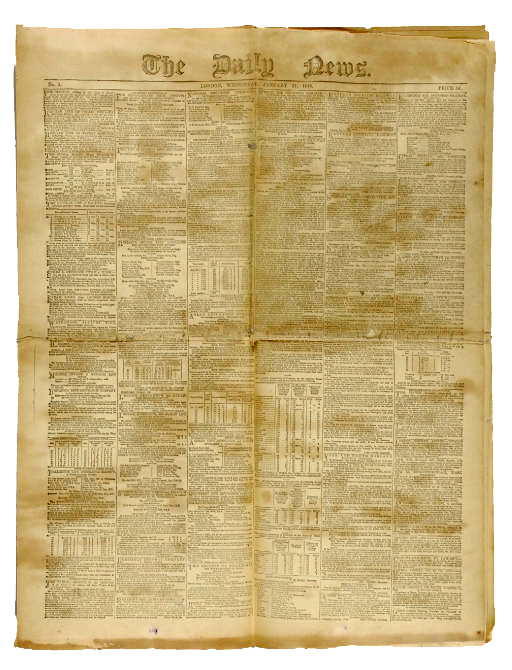
- Front cover of 1858 edition
- Type: Daily newspaper
- Format: Broadsheet
- Founder: Charles Dickens
- Founded: 1846
- Ceased publication: 1930 (Merged with the Daily Chronicle, to become the News Chronicle)
- Language: English
- City: London
- Country: England
- Sister newspapers: The Express (1846–unknown)

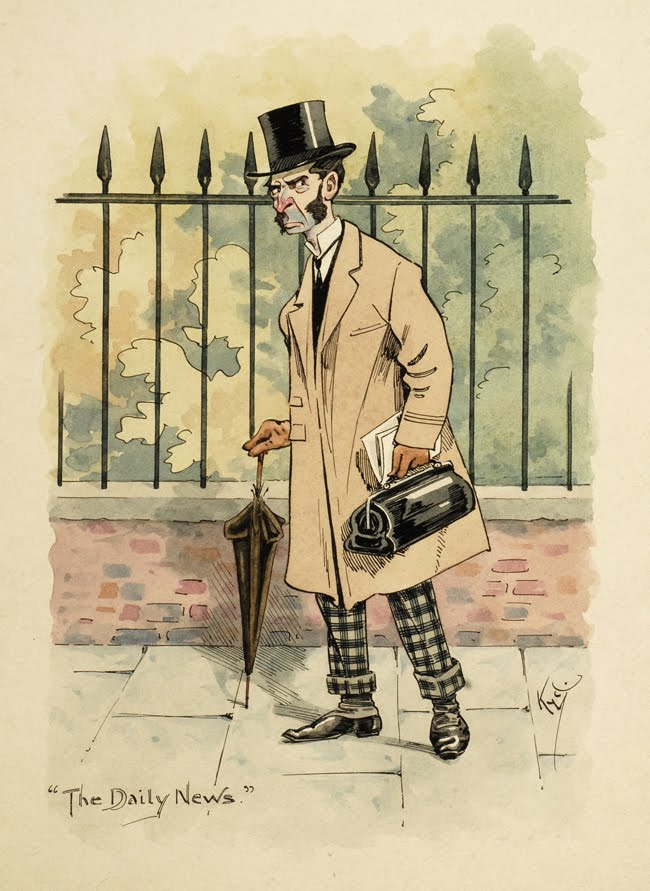
A Reader of The Daily News by Joseph Clayton Clark, c. 1900

The Daily News was a national daily newspaper in the United Kingdom published from 1846 to 1930. From 1846 to at least 1869 it had a sister evening paper, The Express.

The News was founded in 1846 by Charles Dickens, who also served as the newspaper's first editor. It was conceived as a radical rival to the right-wing Morning Chronicle. The paper was not at first a commercial success. Dickens edited 17 issues before handing over the editorship to his friend John Forster, who had more experience in journalism than Dickens. Forster ran the paper until 1870. Charles Mackay, Harriet Martineau, George Bernard Shaw, H. G. Wells, G. K. Chesterton and Ferdinando Petruccelli della Gattina were among the leading reformist writers who wrote for the paper during its heyday. In 1870, the News absorbed the Morning Star. In 1876, The Daily News and its correspondents Edwin Pears and (later) Januarius MacGahan sounded the first alarm respecting the Turkish atrocities in Bulgaria.

In 1901, Quaker chocolate manufacturer George Cadbury bought The Daily News and used the paper to campaign for old age pensions and against sweatshop labour. As a pacifist, Cadbury opposed the Boer War, and the Daily News followed his line.

In 1906, the News sponsored an exhibition on sweated labour at the Queen's Hall. This exhibition was credited with strengthening the women's suffrage movement. In 1909, H. N. Brailsford and H. W. Nevinson resigned from the paper when it refused to condemn the force-feeding of suffragettes.

In 1912, the News merged with the Morning Leader, and was for a time known as the Daily News and Leader. In 1928, it merged with The Westminster Gazette, and in 1930, with the Daily Chronicle to form the centre-left News Chronicle.

The chairman from 1911 to 1930 was Edward Cadbury, eldest son of George Cadbury.

== Editors ==
1846: Charles Dickens
1846: John Forster
1847: Eyre Evans Crowe
1851: Frederick Knight Hunt
1854: William Weir
1858: Thomas Walker
1869: Edward Dicey
1869: Frank Harrison Hill
1886: Sir John Richard Robinson
1896: Edward Tyas Cook
1901: R. C. Lehmann
1902: Alfred George Gardiner
1921: Stuart Hodgson
1926: Tom Clarke
