= Anthony Eyre =

Anthony Eyre may refer to:

- Anthony Eyre (Nottinghamshire MP) (1634–1671), MP for Nottinghamshire
- Anthony Eyre (sheriff) (c. 1691–1748), High Sheriff of Nottinghamshire
- Anthony Eyre (Boroughbridge MP) (1727–1788), MP for Boroughbridge
- Anthony Eyre (RAF officer) (1918–1946), RAF officer
- Anthony Hardolph Eyre (1757–1836), British landowner and politician
