= John Eyre (Archdeacon of Nottingham) =

English archdeacon (1758–1830)

The Venerable John Eyre
- Archdeacon of Nottingham
- Church: Church of England
- Diocese: Diocese of York
- Installed: 4 January 1810
- Term ended: 23 March 1830
- Predecessor: Sir Richard Kaye, Bt
- Successor: William Barrow
- Other posts: Prebend of Apesthorpe, Rector of Beelsby

Personal details
- Born: 15 February 1758
- Died: 23 March 1830 (aged 72)
- Denomination: Anglicanism
- Parents: Anthony Eyre; Judith Laetitia Bury
- Spouse: Charlotte Armytage (after 1790)
- Children: 6
- Education: Brasenose College, Oxford

The Venerable John Eyre (19 February 1758 – 23 March 1830) was Archdeacon of Nottingham

== Early life ==
Eyre was born on 19 February 1758. He was the second son of Anthony Eyre, of Grove Hall, Nottinghamshire, and Judith Laetitia Bury. His father served as MP for Boroughbridge. Through his mother, the family acquired the manor and estate at Headon, Nottinghamshire. In 1762 he purchased the manor and estate of Grove in Nottinghamshire, adjacent to his other properties at Rampton, Treswell and Headon. His elder brother was Anthony Hardolph Eyre, an MP for Nottinghamshire, and his youngest brother was Vice-Admiral of the Red Sir George Eyre, an officer of the Royal Navy who saw service during the American War of Independence, and the French Revolutionary and Napoleonic Wars. A sister, Julia, married Robert Hay-Drummond, 10th Earl of Kinnoull.

His paternal grandparents were Anthony Eyre and the former Margaret Turner (a daughter of Charles Turner of Kirkleatham). His maternal grandparents were John Bury and the former Catherine Hutchinson. His mother was also the great-niece and heiress of Sir Hardolph Wasteneys, 4th Baronet, of Headon.

He was awarded an MA from Brasenose College, Oxford in 1786.

== Career ==
He was collated to the Prebend of Apesthorpe in York Minster, by Archbishop William Markham in 1788. He was presented to All Saints' Church, Babworth in 1796, and to the sinecure rectory of Headon in the same year. He was collated to the parish of Norwell Overall in the collegiate church of Southwell in 1809, and was appointed Archdeacon of Nottingham in 1810.

He was also rector of Beelsby from 1827.

== Personal life ==
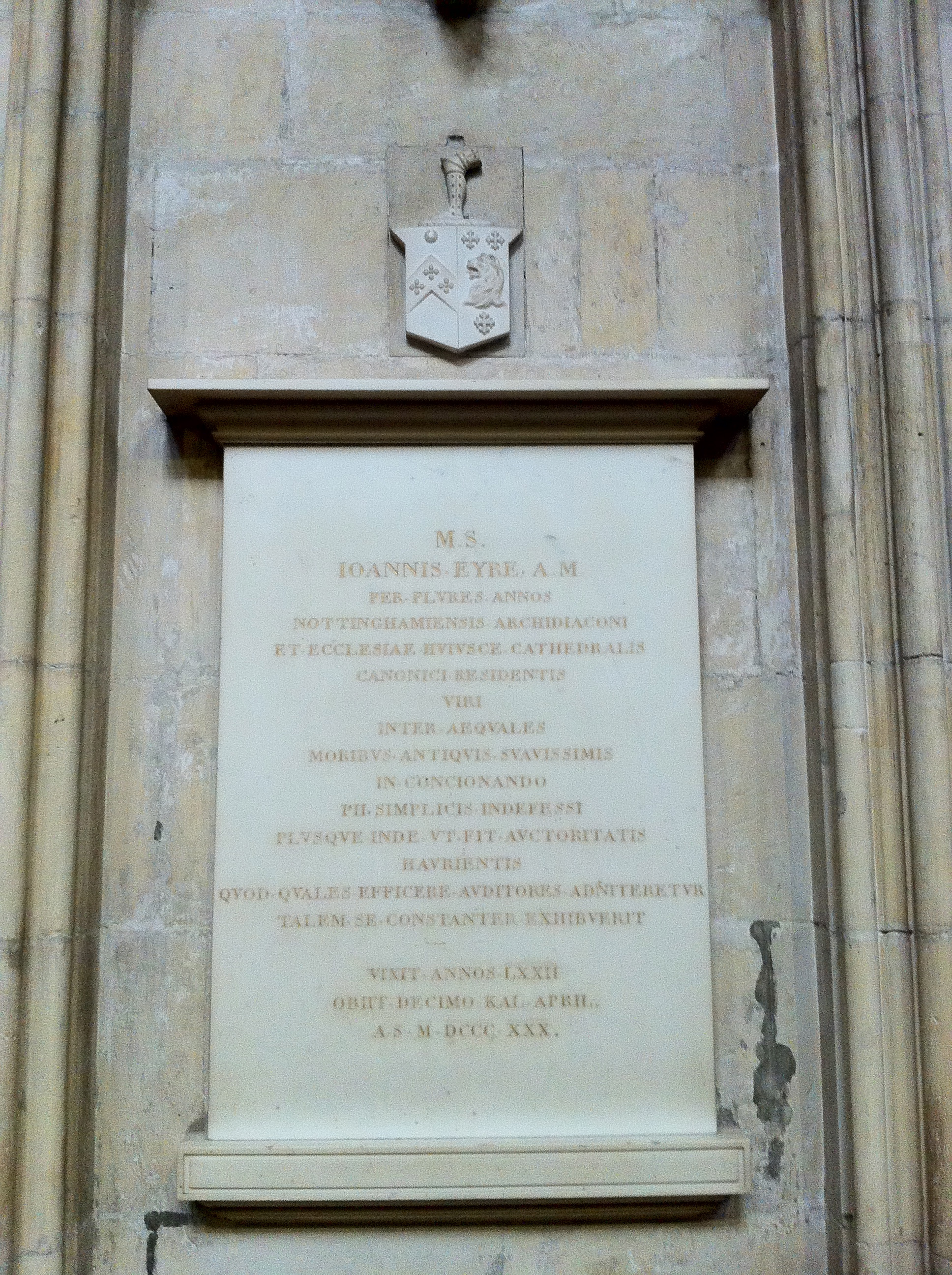
Memorial to John Eyre, Archdeacon of Nottingham, in York Minster

On 12 April 1790, Eyre was married to Charlotte Armytage, daughter of Sir George Armytage, 3rd Baronet, of Kirklees in Yorkshire. Together, they were the parents of the following children:

- John Hardolph Eyre (1792–1817), who married his cousin, Henrietta Eyre, daughter of Anthony Hardolph Eyre.
- Charles Wastaneys Eyre (1802–1862), the rector of Carlton in Lindrick who married Lucy Dorothea Foulis, a daughter of John Robinson Foulis of Buckton, Yorkshire, in 1827; he inherited the manor of Rampton in 1836.
- Anthony Gervase Eyre (b. 1812), who died unmarried.
- Charlotte Eyre (d. 1845), who married Henry Willoughby of Birdsall House, the son of Rev. Hon. James Willoughby (a grandson of the 1st Baron Middleton).
- Anna Maria Eyre (1796–1826), who died unmarried.
- Louisa Henrietta Eyre (1809–1816), who died young.

Eyre died on 23 March 1830.

=== Descendants ===
Through his son Charles, he was a grandfather of Col. Henry Eyre (1834–1904), who sold the Rampton estate in 1893.

Through his daughter Charlotte, he was a grandfather of Henry Willoughby, 8th Baron Middleton, Charlotte Henrietta Willoughby (wife of Henry Willoughby Legard, son of Sir Thomas Legard, 7th Baronet); Francis Digby Willoughby (a Captain in the 9th Lancers); the Rev. Hon. Charles James Willoughby (who married Charlotte Payne Seymour); Emma Willoughby (who the Rev. Richard Machell); Hon. Harriet Cassandra Willoughby (who married Henry's brother-in-law, Godfrey Wentworth Bayard Bosville, de jure 13th Baronet); and the Rev. Hon. Percival George Willoughby (who married Sophia Beaumont, sister of Frederick Beaumont).

=== Legacy ===
His memorial is in the north choir aisle of York Minster.

Church of England titles
Preceded by Sir Richard Kaye, Bt	Archdeacon of Nottingham; 1810–1830	Succeeded by William Barrow
