= Engelard de Cigogné =

French-born administrator who served King John of England

Engelard de Cigogné was a 13th-century French-born administrator from Touraine who served King John of England.

He was born in the little village of Cigogné, just south of Tours in France, a relative (possibly a son or half brother or nephew by marriage) of Gérard d'Athée, a trusted relative and principal overlord, knight and military commander to King John. John had paid a considerable ransom of between 1000m and 2000m to secure Gérard's freedom after he had been captured in the storming of Loches Castle in 1205, of which he was castellan. Gérard had then joined Engelard and other of his relatives in England and had been appointed High Sheriff of Gloucestershire and Herefordshire in 1208.

Engelard was appointed High Sheriff of both Gloucestershire and Herefordshire in 1210, following on from Gérard. The whole family of Gérard, including Engelard, were the only people to be condemned by name in Magna Carta, which was drawn up in 1215 during the baronial revolt of that year. In it the king made a number of commitments to meet the barons' demands, of which Item 50 specifically promised that Gérard Athée and his whole family would henceforth be banned from office. Engelard was duly relieved of his shrievalties in Gloucestershire and Herefordshire, although another member of the proscribed group, Philip Marc, remained in his post as High Sheriff of Nottinghamshire and Derbyshire until 1222. Engelard himself was compensated with the post of Constable of Windsor Castle, which he held until 1223.

The barons had meanwhile invited Prince Louis of France, the future Louis VIII of France, to be King of England in place of John and the French prince duly occupied southern England and besieged the castles of Odiham, Dover and Windsor. As Constable of Windsor Engelard (De Athe) led its resistance to a besieging force led by the Count of Nevers until the besiegers left to pursue other objectives. After peace was restored Engelard was rewarded for his services by being given the manor of Benson in Oxfordshire. He was also appointed High Sheriff of Oxfordshire and Berkshire for 1233 and reinstated as Constable of Windsor Castle in 1234, holding the post until 1242.

He was so trusted by Henry III that he was once appointed to keep Eleanor, Fair Maid of Brittany, in his custody. Eleanor was a cousin of Henry and posed a potential threat to the crown, and was thus confined since 1202, then at Bristol Castle.

He died in 1244. He had married Agatha and had a son, Oliver. The previous Christmas the king had sent him a personal gift of wine as a tribute to a loyal and valued servant of the Crown.
