= Roger Mynors =

Roger Mynors may refer to:

- R. A. B. Mynors (1903–1989), English classicist
- Roger Mynors Swinfen Eady, 3rd Baron Swinfen (born 1938), peer of the House of Lords
- Roger Mynors (MP) (died 1537), English politician
