= Anthony Hardolph Eyre =

British landowner and politician

The Right Honourable Anthony Hardolph Eyre JP

Member of Parliament for Nottinghamshire
- In office 1803–1812 Serving with Viscount Newark
- Preceded by: Charles Pierrepont; Lord William Bentinck
- Succeeded by: Viscount Newark; Lord William Bentinck

Personal details
- Born: 5 March 1757
- Died: 13 March 1836 (aged 79)
- Spouse: Francisca Alicia Bootle (m. 1783; died 1810)
- Relations: Anthony Eyre (grandfather); Charles Pierrepont, Viscount Newark (grandson); Sydney Pierrepont, 3rd Earl Manvers (grandson); Granville Harcourt-Vernon (grandson)
- Children: 4
- Parent(s): Anthony Eyre; Judith Letitia Bury
- Education: Harrow School

Anthony Hardolph Eyre JP (8 March 1757 – 13 April 1836) was a British landowner and politician who sat in the House of Commons.

== Early life ==
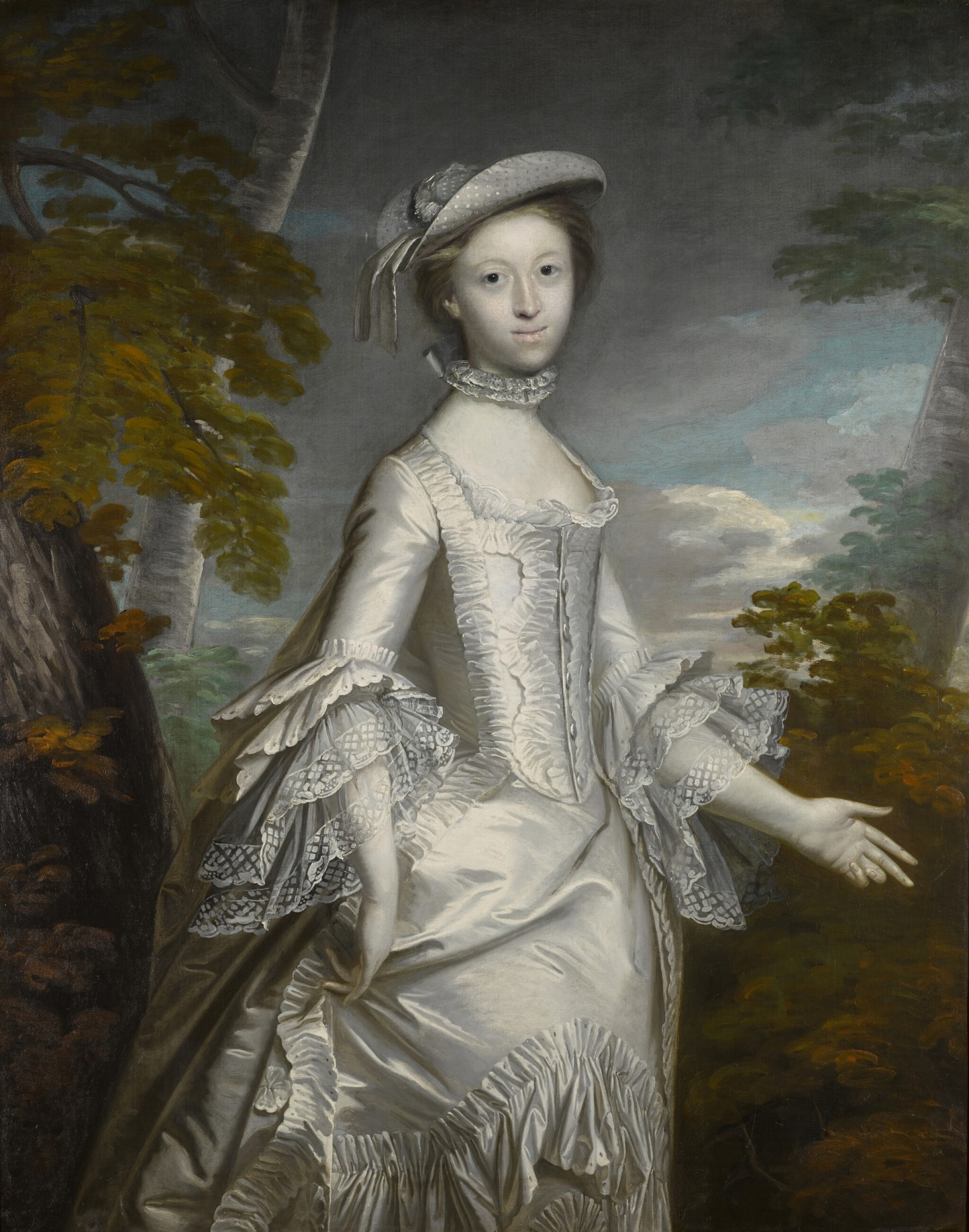
Portrait of his mother, the former Judith Letitia Bury, by Sir Joshua Reynolds, 1755

Anthony was the eldest son of Judith Letitia Bury (1731–1800) and Anthony Eyre (1727–1788) of Grove Hall, who served as MP for Boroughbridge. Through his mother, the family acquired the manor and estate at Headon, Nottinghamshire. In 1762 he purchased the manor and estate of Grove in Nottinghamshire, adjacent to his other properties at Rampton, Treswell and Headon. His younger siblings included John Eyre, the Archdeacon of Nottingham, Vice-Admiral of the Red Sir George Eyre, an officer of the Royal Navy who saw service during the American War of Independence, and the French Revolutionary and Napoleonic Wars, and Julia Eyre, the first wife of Robert Hay-Drummond, 10th Earl of Kinnoull.

He was educated at Harrow School.

== Career ==
Eyre was commissioned as an Ensign in the 1st Foot Guards in 1776, quickly rising to Captain in 1778, and Lieutenant-Colonel in 1787. Following the death of his father in 1788, he succeeded to the family estates before retiring from the British Army in 1790.

In 1794, he served as was Lieutenant-Colonel Commandant of the Nottinghamshire Yeomanry in 1794, and Captain Commandant of the Retford Volunteers in 1803. Also in 1803, he was elected as Member of Parliament for Nottinghamshire, serving alongside his future son-in-law, Charles Pierrepont (styled Viscount Newark from 1806 when his father was created Earl Manvers, a title he inherited in 1816).

After retiring from Parliament in 1812, he devoted himself to county affairs, serving as a Justice of the Peace for many years.

== Personal life ==
In 1783, Eyre married Francisca Alicia Bootle (d. 1810), third daughter of Richard Wilbraham-Bootle and Mary Bootle (daughter and heiress of Robert Bootle of Lathom House, Lancashire). Together, they were the parents of:

- Gervase Anthony Eyre (1791–1811), who served with the 1st Regiment of Foot Guards and was killed at the Battle of Barossa during the Peninsular War.
- Mary Laetitia Eyre (1784–1860) who married Charles Pierrepont, 2nd Earl Manvers in 1804.
- Frances Julia Eyre (d. 1844), who married Granville Harcourt Vernon, a son of Edward Venables-Vernon-Harcourt, Archbishop of York, and Lady Anne Leveson-Gower, daughter of the 1st Marquess of Stafford), in 1814.
- Henrietta Eyre (b. c. 1792), who married her first cousin, John Hardolph Eyre, son of John Eyre and Charlotte Armytage (a daughter of Sir George Armytage, 3rd Baronet). After his death in 1817, she married amateur poet Henry Gally Knight, MP for Aldborough, Malton, and North Nottinghamshire.

As his only son died in 1811, his estates were divided between his younger daughters Frances (whose husband Granville inherited Grove and Headon), and Henrietta (whose husband's brother, Charles Wasteneys Eyre, inherited Rampton) after his death in 1836.

=== Descendants ===
Through his daughter Mary, he was a grandfather of Charles Evelyn Pierrepont, Viscount Newark (MP for East Retford); Sydney Pierrepont, 3rd Earl Manvers; Lady Mary Frances Pierrepont (wife of married Edward Christopher Egerton); and Lady Annora Charlotte Pierrepont (wife of Charles Watkin Williams-Wynn).

Through his daughter Frances, he was a grandfather of Granville Harcourt-Vernon, MP for Newark.

Parliament of the United Kingdom
Preceded by Viscount Newark; Lord William Bentinck	Member of Parliament for Nottinghamshire; 1803–1812; With: Charles Pierrepont	Succeeded by Viscount Newark; Lord William Bentinck
