= John Hercy =

16th-century English politician

Sir John Hercy (before 1499 – 1570) was an English landowner and Member of Parliament.

He was the son of Humphrey Hercy of Grove, near Retford, Nottinghamshire, and Elizabeth, a daughter of Sir John Digby of Eye Kettleby near Melton Mowbray. He inherited the 1500 acre Grove estate from his father in 1521.

He was a justice of the peace for Nottinghamshire and appointed High Sheriff of Nottinghamshire three times, for 1532–33, 1543–44 and 1548–49. He was elected knight of the shire (MP) for Nottinghamshire in 1539 and again in October 1553. He was knighted in 1547.

He married Elizabeth, the daughter and heiress of Sir John Stanley of Elford, Staffordshire and the widow of Sir James Lee of Aston, Staffordshire, in 1554. They had no children. The Grove estate was awarded to Barbara, one of his eight sisters, who had married George Nevile of Ragnall.
