= Sheriff of Nottingham =

Antagonist to Robin Hood

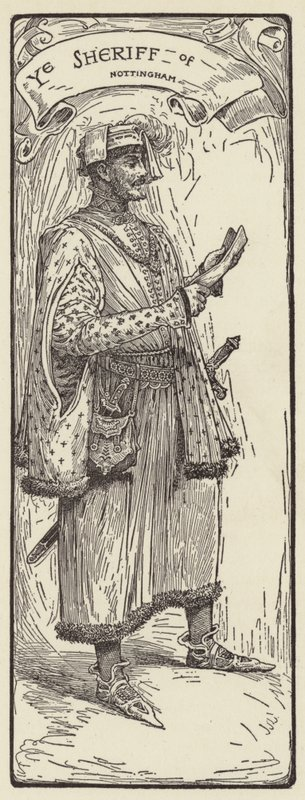
1912 illustration of the Sheriff of Nottingham by Louis Rhead

The Sheriff of Nottingham is the main antagonist in the legend of Robin Hood. He is generally depicted as an unjust tyrant who mistreats the people of Nottinghamshire, subjecting them to unaffordable taxes. Robin Hood fights against him, stealing from the rich, and the Sheriff, in order to give to the poor; it is this characteristic for which Robin Hood is best known. The Sheriff is considered the archenemy of Robin Hood, as he is the most recurring enemy of the well-known outlaw. The Sheriff appears in some of the earliest texts featuring Robin Hood, such as the fifteenth-century ballad A Gest of Robyn Hode.

It is not known upon whom this character is based. The legend of Robin Hood (which is at least as old as the 14th century) traditionally referred to the Sheriff of Nottingham only by his title. The post of Sheriff of Nottingham only came into existence in 1449. However, there has from very early Norman times been a High Sheriff of Nottinghamshire, Derbyshire and the Royal Forests, appointed by the king, which became High Sheriff of Nottinghamshire in 1568. The character in the legend could therefore have been based on the royal appointee responsible for law enforcement in the royal forests (which included Sherwood Forest).

== Character ==
It is the task of the holder of the office of Nottingham's Sheriff to capture outlaws such as Robin Hood, either to ensure the safety of trade routes through Sherwood Forest or to keep them from poaching the King's deer. In some stories, the Sheriff of Nottingham is portrayed as having a lecherous desire for Robin Hood's lady Maid Marian. He is widely considered to be the principal villain of the Robin Hood stories, appearing frequently alongside such enemies of Robin Hood as Sir Guy of Gisborne or John, King of England (though rarely both).

The legends are generally set far from Nottingham; this fits the historical position of High Sheriff of Nottinghamshire, Derbyshire and the Royal Forests (from 1068 until 1568). In the film Robin Hood: Prince of Thieves, the Sheriff's influence outside the region of Nottingham has grown so great, he attempts to take control of the throne.

In some versions, the Sheriff is a cowardly schemer while his assistant, Sir Guy of Gisborne, is a more competent and determined physical threat to Robin. In other versions, the Sheriff answers to Prince John.

== Possible historical basis ==
If one treats the legend as having had its origins in real events (despite the fact that the earliest known version of the legend appears 200 years later), the character could have been based upon one of (or a composite of multiple of) the real life people who occupied the post of High Sheriff of Nottinghamshire, Derbyshire and the Royal Forests at the relevant time. Several historians have analysed individuals from the North of England in the medieval period who could have inspired the legendary character. The earliest version of the Robin Hood legend takes place during the time of "Edward our comely king". If, as in many versions of the Robin Hood legend, the action of the story is placed during the absence of King Richard I of England in 1190–1193 during the Third Crusade and his subsequent holding to ransom in Austria, the character could be identified with the little-known William de Wendenal, who was High Sheriff from 1191 to 1194. In some versions, the Sheriff is identified with Philip Marc, who held the office of High Sheriff of Nottinghamshire, Derbyshire and the Royal Forests from 1209 to 1221, during the later years of the reign of John, King of England (who ruled from 1199 to 1216). Philip Marc's deputy sheriff, Eustace of Lowdham, has also been proposed as a possible figure who inspired the story of the Sheriff of Nottingham. Brian de Lisle, an ally of King John and later Sheriff of Yorkshire (in 1233/4) has been suggested as another possible claimant. Chronicler Matthew Paris described the hanging of 28 boy hostages from the walls of Nottingham Castle in 1212 on the instruction of the king.

Professor John Bellamy suggested Henry de Faucumberg as a candidate for the Sheriff of Nottingham. Henry De Faucumberg (also known as Henry de Fauconberg) was a Yorkshire nobleman. Despite the fact that de Faucumberg had been fined for committing theft in 1314, he was given the position of Sheriff of Nottinghamshire in 1318, and later was made Sheriff of Yorkshire in 1326. Writer P. Valentine Harris claimed the Sheriff was based on John de Segrave, the Constable of Nottingham Castle and a high-ranking forester of Edward II's time. Sir Robert Ingram, a former Mayor of Nottingham who was allied with the criminal Coterel gang, has been also postulated as the "original" for the Sheriff of Nottingham. In many retellings, however, the Sheriff remains either anonymous or pseudonymous.

== Portrayals ==
=== On stage ===
- He was portrayed on Broadway in 1891 in The Sheriff of Nottingham by H. C. Barnabee.

=== In film and television ===
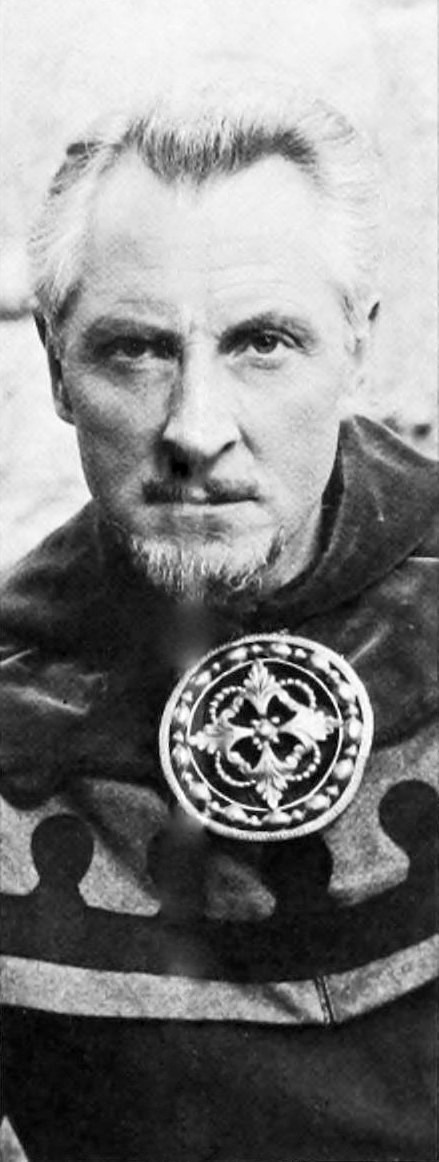
Alan Wheatley as the Sheriff of Nottingham in the 1950s television series, The Adventures of Robin Hood

- In the 1938 film The Adventures of Robin Hood, starring Errol Flynn in the title role, the Sheriff is portrayed by Melville Cooper. He is nominally characterised as a coward and a secondary to Sir Guy of Gisbourne but is actually quite intelligent. For instance, he is the one who prudently advises Sir Guy to increase their caravan's security to ward off a possible ambush by Robin Hood, which Sir Guy disregards to his sorrow, and he is the mastermind of the archery tournament trap that captures Robin Hood. When King Richard reclaims the throne, the Sheriff of Nottingham is among the followers of Prince John that are exiled from England.
- In the 1950s ITV series The Adventures of Robin Hood, he is portrayed by Alan Wheatley as a competent and ruthless enemy who is not quite Robin's equal in combat. Wheatley was replaced late in the series with John Arnatt as the deputy Sheriff, a more treacherous, duplicitous villain who was more on par with Robin's fighting skills.
- In The Goon Show episode Ye Bandit of Sherwood Forest first broadcast on 28 December 1954, the Sheriff of Nottingham is portrayed by Peter Sellers as Hercules Grytpype-Thynne. When the script was rewritten as Robin Hood and his Merry Men, recorded on 2 December 1956, the part was played by Valentine Dyall.
- In Disney's 1953 film The Story of Robin Hood, the Sheriff of Nottingham is portrayed by Peter Finch.
- In the 1960s Canadian sci-fi series Rocket Robin Hood, set in the year 3000, the Sheriff of N.O.T.T. (the National Outer space Terrestrial Territories) is a secondary antagonist, serving Prince John and constantly outwitted by Rocket Robin Hood. In the episode "The Sad, Sad Sheriff of NOTT", Prince John orders the Sheriff's execution for his constant failure to capture Rocket Robin Hood. When Robin learns of this, wary of the idea of a new Sheriff, he and his men capture the Sheriff, as well as a cache of the Prince's jewels. They then allow the Sheriff to escape with the jewels, which redeems the Sheriff (who was unaware that Robin and his men let him escape) to the Prince. The Sheriff was voiced by Gillie Fenwick.
- In Disney's 1973 animated film of Robin Hood, the Sheriff is a large anthropomorphic wolf voiced by Alabama-born comedian Pat Buttram. Although still playing a prominent role, he nevertheless is reduced to the film's secondary antagonist and serves as chief enforcer to the primary antagonist Prince John, collecting unlimited taxes and hunting Robin Hood and Little John. This version is depicted as being far less smart than he realises, claiming he can see through Robin Hood's disguises when he fails to see through two of them. He briefly battles Robin inside Prince John's burning tower in the film's climax. Eventually King Richard sentences him to breaking rocks down in the Royal Rock Pile, along with Prince John and Sir Hiss. During story development, the animators considered experimenting with a different animal concept for the villain by making him a goat. However, they were overruled by the director who wanted to keep to traditional animal stereotypes and ordered the Sheriff be a wolf.

The Sheriff of Nottingham (voiced by Pat Buttram) in the 1973 Disney animated film, Robin Hood

- In the 1975 BBC TV series The Legend of Robin Hood, the Sheriff is played by Paul Darrow. He is portrayed as a ruthless schemer, willing to murder the Archbishop of Grantham in order to guarantee silence. He is close friends with Prince John, usually sharing his plans with him, and is frequently seen playing chess with himself.
- The Sheriff is more sympathetically portrayed by Robert Shaw in the 1976 film Robin and Marian, which also stars Audrey Hepburn as Maid Marian and Sean Connery as Robin Hood. He is represented as a literate and perceptive figure who, like the long-absent Robin, has become tired and disillusioned in late middle age. Wryly the "two old men" note that if Robin has only achieved minor military rank in the service of King Richard then the Sheriff as an educated man has been passed over for further advancement in the oafish court of King John. In spite of glimpses of mutual respect the two fight to the death in a one-on-one sword duel towards the end of the film.
- In Robin of Sherwood, the Sheriff is portrayed as a cynical opportunist given to violent outbursts, portrayed by Nickolas Grace. His name, Robert de Rainault, comes from Evelyn Charles Vivian's retelling of the legend. He also bears the dubious honour of being the first sheriff to kill Robin. Grace's portrayal of a moody and obsessive individual, with a sardonic sense of black humour, was a notable influence on future interpretations of the role.
- In Robin Hood: Prince of Thieves (1991), in which he is the main antagonist, he is portrayed by Alan Rickman. His given name is said to be George. As the Prince John character is completely absent from this adaptation, this Sheriff is more ambitious than most depictions. The Sheriff's agenda is apparently to supplant Richard the Lionheart by marrying into royalty, eventually becoming king, or at least ensuring his future descendants would assume the throne. He is the leader of a cult of Devil Worshipers, that include several English barons who would support his claim, if successful. Rickman's performance would garner him the BAFTA Award for Best Actor in a Supporting Role, and also earned him praise as one of the best actors to portray a villain in films.
- In the anime series Robin Hood no Daibōken, the main antagonist Baron Alwyn (voiced by Masashi Ebara) is based on the Sheriff of Nottingham in both character design and personality as well as actions. He taxes the people and his workers while keeping them working for him. Near the end of the series, due to Robin's constant thwarting and a near death experience by him, he seemingly starts to make a change for the better until coming across a plot that would allow him to take over the kingdom; thus changing him back to his greedy, inconsiderate self. Once again, however, his plan of action is stopped by Robin and his allies as well as King Richard.
- In the animated series Young Robin Hood, The Sheriff of Nottingham (voiced by A.J. Henderson) is a harsh man and good swordsman. He serves as one of the show's main antagonists and works for Prince John.
- The Sheriff of Nottingham is spoofed as The Sheriff of Rottingham (portrayed by Roger Rees), in Mel Brooks' 1993 movie Robin Hood: Men in Tights. This depiction of the Sheriff appears to suffer from a form of aphasia, often mixing up his words. When the Sheriff of Rottingham is badly wounded by Robin Hood, the witch Latrine saves him by giving him a magical Life Saver in exchange for marriage.
- The Sheriff was parodied in the children's television series Maid Marian and her Merry Men as a foolish schemer, portrayed by Tony Robinson.
- In the Star Trek: The Next Generation episode "Qpid", Q takes on the role of the Sheriff of Nottingham.
- He was portrayed by Keith Allen in the BBC series Robin Hood, from 2006. Allen plays the Sheriff, named Vaisey, as a psychopath with a manipulative, sarcastic nature. In the show's third series, Vaisey is deposed by Prince John as a result of his failure to assassinate King Richard, whereupon he fakes his own death. He is temporarily replaced by his seeming killer, Guy of Gisborne, for one episode before Gisborne is outlawed; Gisborne's sister Isabella becomes Sheriff for several episodes before Vaisey returns, planning to regain Nottingham by force, in the series finale.
- In the 2010 Ridley Scott film Robin Hood, a cowardly, inept and lecherous Sheriff of Nottingham is portrayed by actor Matthew Macfadyen. The original spec script from which the film developed, "Nottingham", the Sheriff, based on Robert of Thornham, is the protagonist in the story, working to solve a string of murders for which an antihero Robin Hood has been falsely accused.
- In 2013, Wil Traval portrayed the Sheriff and his counterpart Keith in Lacey, an episode of the second season of Once Upon a Time. A second iteration named Clayton, portrayed by Cory Rempel, appears in the seventh season, in the episode The Girl in the Tower, where he serves as the main antagonist.
- In "Robot of Sherwood", the third episode of the eighth series of Doctor Who (2014), the Sheriff was played by Ben Miller. In this portrayal, he is killed when Robin Hood knocks him into a vat of liquid gold.
- Ben Mendelsohn portrayed the Sheriff in the 2018 film Robin Hood. After the Sheriff is hanged by Robin during the film's climax, he is succeeded by Will "Scarlet" Tillman.
- Bob Cryer played the Sheriff (named William de Wendenal) in the 2022 film The Adventures of Maid Marian.
- Sean Bean portrays the Sheriff in the 2025 Robin Hood series from MGM+.

=== In literature ===
- The Sheriff of Nottingham appears as an antagonist in the series of young adult fantasy books The Sisters Grimm, where he is depicted as a law enforcer in Ferryport Landing, still harbouring a deep hatred for Robin Hood, his sworn enemy.
- Richard Kluger's novel The Sheriff of Nottingham (1992) gives a positive portrayal of the real-life 13th-century sheriff Philip Mark as a good man doing a thankless task. (The same sheriff appeared as a ruthless despot in an episode of the Robin of Sherwood TV series.)

=== In other media ===
- The Sheriff is portrayed as the main antagonist in the board game Sheriff of Nottingham by Arcane Wonders, where players take turns in his role while the other players try to smuggle goods past his notice.
- In the 2001 video game Stronghold Crusader, the Sheriff of Nottingham appears as an AI character. He is portrayed as a cruel lord who will use every dirty trick in the book to increase his power.
