= Anthony Eyre (Boroughbridge MP) =

British landowner & politician (1727–1788)

Member of Parliament for Boroughbridge
- In office 1774–1784 Serving with Charles Mellish, Colonel William Phillips, Charles Ambler
- Preceded by: Nathaniel Cholmley; Major-General Henry Clinton
- Succeeded by: Sir Richard Sutton, Bt; Henry Temple

Personal details
- Born: 9 January 1727
- Died: 14 February 1788 (aged 61)
- Spouse: Judith Letitia Bury (m. 1755; died 1788)
- Relations: Gervase Eyre (grandfather)
- Parent(s): Anthony Eyre; Margaret Turner
- Education: Christ Church, Oxford

Anthony Eyre (9 January 1727 – 14 February 1788) was a British landowner and politician who sat in the House of Commons between 1774 and 1784.

== Early life ==
Eyre was born on 9 January 1727. He was the only surviving son of Anthony Eyre (c. 1691–1748), High Sheriff of Nottinghamshire, and his wife, Margaret Turner (d. 1748). Among his siblings were elder brother Gervase (who died unmarried), Margaret Eyre (who married Bache Thornhill), Katherine Eyre (who married Matthew Dodsworth), and Mary Eyre (who married Anthony Cooke).

His father was the eldest surviving son of Gervase Eyre of Rampton near East Retford, and Catherine Cooke (daughter and eventual heiress of Sir Henry Cooke, 2nd Baronet of Wheatley). His maternal grandfather was Charles Turner of Kirkleatham, Yorkshire.

He matriculated at Christ Church, Oxford on 11 December 1745.

== Career ==
Eyre was returned as Member of Parliament for Boroughbridge on the interest of the Duke of Newcastle at the 1774 general election. He was returned unopposed in 1780. In 1783 he voted against Newcastle on a matter of principle and in a letter of apology commented that he did not expect to be brought in at the 1784 general election and did not stand.

=== Estates ===
Eyre's father had torn down the old family manor house at Rampton, and moved to the family's other residence at Laughton-en-le-Morthen, South Yorkshire. He also bought an estate at Adwick le Street near Doncaster from his uncle, Sir George Cooke, 3rd Baronet, in 1733, and lived there until his death in 1748 when young Eyre succeeded to his father's estates of Rampton, Laughton-en-le-Morthen, and Adwick le Street.

From his 1755 marriage to Judith, the Eyre family obtained the manor of Headon, and lands around Bilsby in eastern Lincolnshire, which were inherited from the Johnson family. In 1762, Eyre sold the Adwick estate and having acquired Grove Park near East Retford, and other land at Grove, Little Gringley and Ordsall, moved back to Nottinghamshire. He sold the Laughton estate in 1767.

== Personal life ==
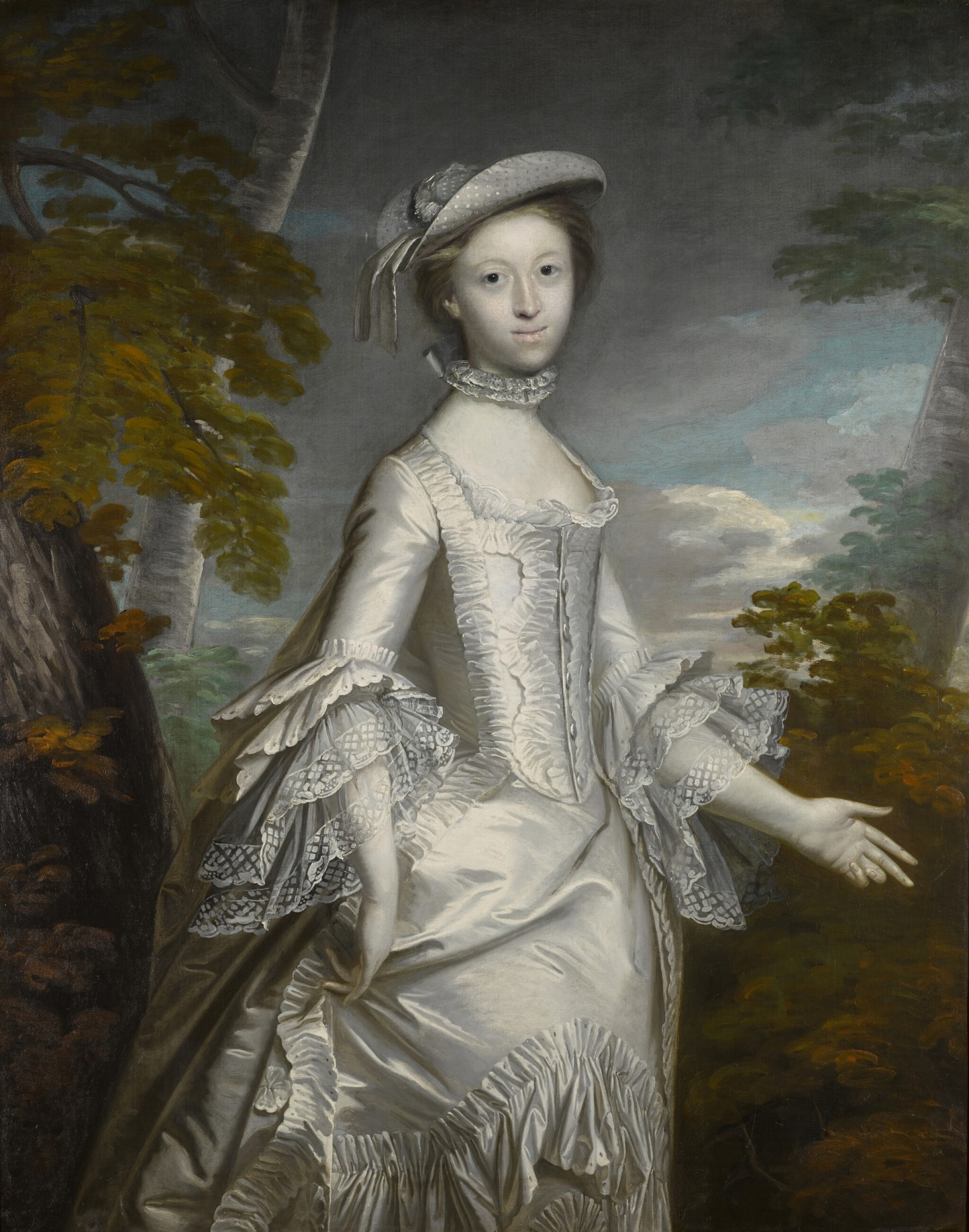
Portrait of his wife, the former Judith Letitia Bury, by Sir Joshua Reynolds, 1755

In 1755, Eyre married Judith Letitia Bury (1731–1800), a daughter of Catherine (née Hutchinson) Bury and John Bury of Grange, near Grantham. She was also the great-niece and heiress of Sir Hardolph Wasteneys, 4th Baronet, of Headon. Together, they were the parents of:

- Anthony Hardolph Eyre (1757–1836), an MP for Nottinghamshire who married Francisca Wilbraham-Bootle, a daughter of Richard Wilbraham-Bootle of Lathom House, in 1783.
- John Eyre (1758–1830), the Archdeacon of Nottingham who married Charlotte Armytage, daughter of Sir George Armytage, 3rd Baronet.
- Julia Eyre (c. 1760–1780), who married Robert Hay-Drummond, 10th Earl of Kinnoull in 1779.
- Charles Eyre (1768–1796), rector of Grove and Headon.
- Sir George Eyre (1769–1839), Vice-Admiral of the Red who saw service during the American War of Independence, and the French Revolutionary and Napoleonic Wars.

Eyre died in 1788 and was buried at Rampton All Saints, where he has a monument.

Parliament of Great Britain
Preceded by Nathaniel Cholmley; Major-General Henry Clinton	Member of Parliament for Boroughbridge; 1774–1784; With: Charles Mellish; Colonel William Phillips; Charles Ambler	Succeeded by Sir Richard Sutton, Bt; Henry Temple
