= Mynors =

Mynors is both a surname and a given name. Notable people with the name include:

- R. A. B. Mynors (1903–1989), British classical scholar
- Roger Mynors Swinfen Eady, 3rd Baron Swinfen, (born 1938) peer of the House of Lords
- Roger Mynors (MP), (died 1537) English politician
- William Mynors, captain of the East India Company vessel the Royal Mary
- Mynors Bright (1818–1883), English academic, president of Magdalene College, Cambridge from 1853 to 1873

== See also ==
- Mynors baronets, a title in the Baronetage of the United Kingdom
