= William de Wendenal =

Norman baron

William de Wendenal (also William de Wendeval) was a late-12th-century Norman baron, a High Sheriff for two English counties from 1190 to 1194, when King Richard the Lionheart was away on the Third Crusade as Sheriff of Nottinghamshire, Derbyshire and the Royal Forests. Wendenal has been proposed by some folklorists as the historical figure who inspired the legendary Sheriff of Nottingham.

== Biography ==
Little is known of William. He is mentioned in the book Chronica magistri Rogeri de Hoveden by the historian Roger of Howden. William served as the High Sheriff (or law-enforcer and bailiff) of the counties of both Derbyshire and Nottinghamshire during the years of King Richard's absence from the country. William took over these duties in 1190 from baron Roger de Lizoures. However, when King Richard landed back in England in late March 1194, William de Ferrers, 4th Earl of Derby succeeded William de Wendenal as Sheriff of Nottinghamshire, Derbyshire and the Royal Forests. After this, William de Wendenal simply disappears from the historical record.

== In popular culture ==
In the third book of The Youngest Templar series by Michael Spradlin, the protagonist Tristan and his friend Robard Hode clash with William de Wendenal after the latter imprisons Hode's father.

In the 2022 Robin Hood film The Adventures of Maid Marian, the antagonist, the Sheriff of Nottingham (played by Bob Cryer), is named William de Wendenal.

In the 2023 Global TV series Robyn Hood, the Sheriff of New Nottingham (played by Kira Guloien) is named Willa Wendenal.
