= St Helen's Church, Grove =

Coordinates: 53°18′27″N 00°53′39″W

St. Helen's Church, Grove
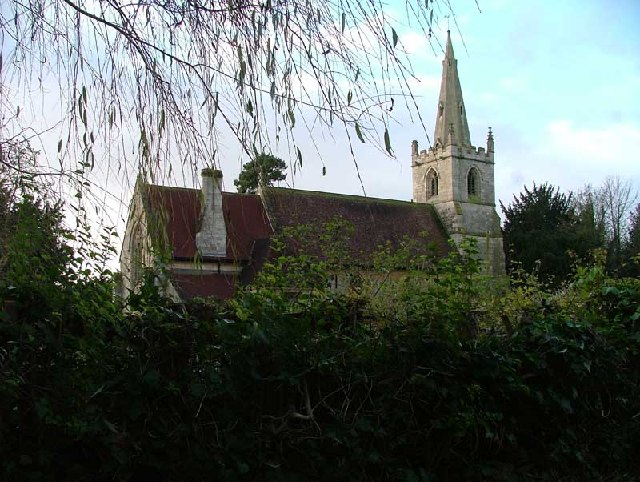
- St. Helen's Church, Grove
- Denomination: Church of England
- Churchmanship: Broad Church

History
- Dedication: St. Helen

Administration
- Province: York
- Diocese: Southwell and Nottingham
- Deanery: Bassetlaw & Bawtry
- Parish: Grove

Clergy
- Vicar: Rev J Jesson

St. Helen's Church, Grove is a parish church in the Church of England in Grove, Nottinghamshire.

The church is Grade II listed by the Department for Digital, Culture, Media and Sport as it is a building of special architectural or historic interest.

== History ==
The foundation is medieval but the current church is by C. Hodgson Fowler, dating from 1882.

The period when this church was founded is not exactly known, but in all probability it was anterior to the Norman Conquest, as in Domesday Book is observed, that here was a priest and a church, and 8 acres (32,000 m^{2}) of meadow; pasture wood one league long and half-a-one broad, of the yearly value of 40 shillings. Anciently it was a double rectory, and also a vicarage of medieties, but on the 3rd of the nones of May, 1227, Walter de Grey, Archbishop of York, consolidated them, when George de Ordsall, who was vicar of one mediety, was presented to the whole by Malvesinus de Hercy, (the first of that ancient family,) on condition that he should allow the rector 28s. per annum, for ever.

In 1425, Sir Thomas Hercy, Knight, bequeathed to the rector of this church, "in name of his principal", his best horse with his array, according to his estate. Humphrey Hercy, Esq. at his death, bequeathed "his soul to God, and his body to be buried in the Queare or Chancel of the Invention of the Crosse of Grove."

"The situation of this church is peculiarly pleasing and interesting; seated on an eminence, and surrounded by trees rendered venerable from their great age, it may with propriety be stiled a place where

"The traveller outworn with life's pilgrimage dreary, Lays down his rude staff like one that is weary, And sweetly reposes for ever."

Indeed, the whole scene is calculated to excite those finer feelings of the mind whilst ruminating over the scattered fragments of mortality; whilst they, unconscions of the visitors tread, sleep on in silence and obscurity. Here the ashes of some of the bravest and best of human kind commingle together, and although the destroyer—Time, has obliterated nearly all the visible signs which once mark’d the hallowed spot, he has not yet been enabled altogether to blast with his oblivious breath those records which bear testimony that they have once existed."

The church is small and ancient; it is dedicated to St. Helen, and consists of a nave and chancel; in its exterior it has nothing whereof to boast, its interior is simple, clean, and in good repair. The tower is squat and contains two bells.

== Memorials ==
Within the chancel are two or three curious antique monumental floor stones, on one of which is inscribed an ornamental cross, hut the rest is illegible. By the side of this is another to the memory of Hugo de Hercy, on which

"Outstretch’d together are exprest, He and my Lady fair; With hands uplifted on the breast, In attitude of prayer."

This is an alabaster slab, six feet six inches long, and three feet three inches broad; one of the figures represents a man in armour, on his head a hat and feather, a greyhound at his feet looking up,—the face worn out: at his side a woman,—her face and head-dress very indistinct, on the left side of her head some appearance of a reticulated dress. The crack across the stone is so splintered that whatsoever has been at her feet is not now to be known. Above the man's head is a shield, but the colours are quite indistinct; above the woman's, the saltire is engraved, with a round pell,.— it appears black, being inlaid with pitch. Near the edge of the stone—

"Hic jacet Hugo Hercy qui obiit VI die Decembris anno dm m. cccc. I. V. et Elizabeth uxor ejus quae obiit anno dm m. cccc. I. Animae proprietur Deus."

In the aisle is another, having the following,—.

Resvrgam Katharine Neville obiit 17mo. die Mass 1683.

In the chancel is a neat mural monument as under,—

To the memory of WILLIAM LEVINZ, Esq. only son of Sir Creswell Levinz, Kt. Judge of the Court of Common Pleas, whose many virtues he inherited, having represented in Parliament for many years the Borough of East Retforel, and then this county, with uncommon abilities, diligence and integrity. He died May 7, 1747, aged 76 years. He married Anne daughter of Samuel Buck, Esq. barrister at law, a partner worthy of so much merit, who died June 15, 1726, in the 51st year of her age, and lieth here interred.

The living of Grove is a rectory, and when Mr. Hercy was paton, it was valued at £10; it is now £11. 14s. 2d. in the king's books, and pays for tenths, £1. 3s. 5d.; for first fruits, 6s. 5d.; and for synodals, 3s. Patron, Anthony Hardolph Eyre, Esq. Incumbent, Rev. Abraham Youle, M. A.

== Parish structure ==
The church is in a group of parishes which includes

- St. Nicholas' Church, Askham
- St. Helen's Church, Grove
- Church of St. John the Baptist, East Markham
- St. Peter's Church, Headon-cum-Upton

== Organ ==
The church has a two manual pipe organ by Bevington dating from 1859. It was installed in St Helen's Church in 1894. A specification of the organ can be found on the National Pipe Organ Register.

== See also ==
- Listed buildings in Grove, Nottinghamshire
