= Willoughby Lake =

Royal Navy Admiral (1773–1847)

Admiral Sir Willoughby Lake KCB
- Born: 8 January 1773
- Died: 18 February 1847 (aged 74)
- Military career
- Allegiance: Great Britain; United Kingdom
- Branch: Royal Navy
- Rank: Admiral
- Commands: HMS Rattler; HMS Topaze; HMS Gibraltar; HMS Magnificent; North American Station
- Conflicts: Napoleonic Wars
- Awards: Knight Commander of the Order of the Bath

Admiral Sir Willoughby Thomas Lake KCB (8 January 1773 – 18 February 1847) was a Royal Navy officer who went on to be Commander-in-Chief, North American Station.

== Naval career ==
Born the son of Sir James Winter Lake, 3rd Baronet and Joyce Crowther, Lake joined the Royal Navy around 1790. By 1795 he was in command of the sloop HMS Rattler. He was promoted to post captain in 1796.

In April 1803 he took command of HMS Topaze. In her he captured four privateers before leaving her in June 1806 for HMS Gibraltar, the ship in which, in 1807, he chased Napoleon Bonaparte's brother along the French coast. He also commanded Magnificent during an attack on Santander in 1812. He went on to be Commander-in-Chief, North American Station in 1824 and was promoted to Admiral of the White in 1842.

== Family ==
In 1795 he married Charlotte MacBride, daughter of John MacBride; they had one daughter.

Military offices
Preceded by Sir William Fahie	Commander-in-Chief, North America and West Indies Station; 1824–1827	Succeeded by Sir Charles Ogle
