= Listed buildings in Grove, Nottinghamshire =

Grove is a civil parish in the Bassetlaw District of Nottinghamshire, England. The parish contains five listed buildings that are recorded in the National Heritage List for England. All the listed buildings are designated at Grade II, the lowest of the three grades, which is applied to "buildings of national importance and special interest". The parish contains the village of Grove and the surrounding countryside. All the listed buildings are in the village, and consist of a church, its lych gate, former almshouses, a former rectory and a war memorial.

== Buildings ==
Name and location	Photograph	Date	Notes
The Old Rectory; 53.30713°N 0.89510°W	—	Late 17th century	The rectory, later a private house, has been extended, and is in brick, partly rendered, on a stone plinth, with stone dressings, a floor band, and roofs of pantile and slate, with a shouldered shaped gable and a coped gable with kneelers. There are two storeys and attics, and an L-shaped plan, with fronts of three and seven bays. Features include single and two-storey bay windows, and the other windows are a mix of casements, one mullioned and transomed, and some with segmental heads, and sashes, some horizontally-sliding.
Former almshouses 53.30732°N 0.89494°W		Mid 18th century	The almshouses, now in ruin and overgrown, are in brick with a floor band and pantile roofs. There is a single storey and attics, and two bays. The central pair of doors have plain jambs, and the windows are a mix of casements and horizontally-sliding sashes.
Lych gate and wall, St Helen's Church; 53.30732°N 0.89387°W		Late 19th century	The lych gate at the entrance to the churchyard has a stone base, a timber superstructure, and a pantile roof, and it contains a pair of oak gates. The boundary wall of the churchyard has ramped coping, and extends for about 150 metres (490 ft). It is curved and shouldered at the lych gate, and contains three square piers with chamfered bases and pyramidal caps.
St Helen's Church; 53.30735°N 0.89426°W		1882	The church was designed by C. Hodgson Fowler in Decorated style. It is built in stone with tile roofs, and consists of a nave, a south porch, a chancel with an organ chamber and a vestry, and a west steeple. The steeple has a tower with three stages, diagonal buttresses, a canted stair turret and a clock face on the south side, lancet windows, two string courses, two-light bell openings, an eaves band, eight gargoyles, and an embattled parapet with four crocketed pinnacles. The tower is surmounted by a recessed octagonal spire with two tiers of lucarnes and a finial.
War memorial 53.30831°N 0.89307°W		1923	The war memorial stands on a knoll, and is approached by a flight of stone-flagged steps. It is in granite, and has an elaborate cross head with a collar, on a heptagonal shaft. At its base, the shaft splays out to a heptagonal plinth. On three of the plinth's faces is an inscription relating to the First World War.
