= Gérard d'Athée =

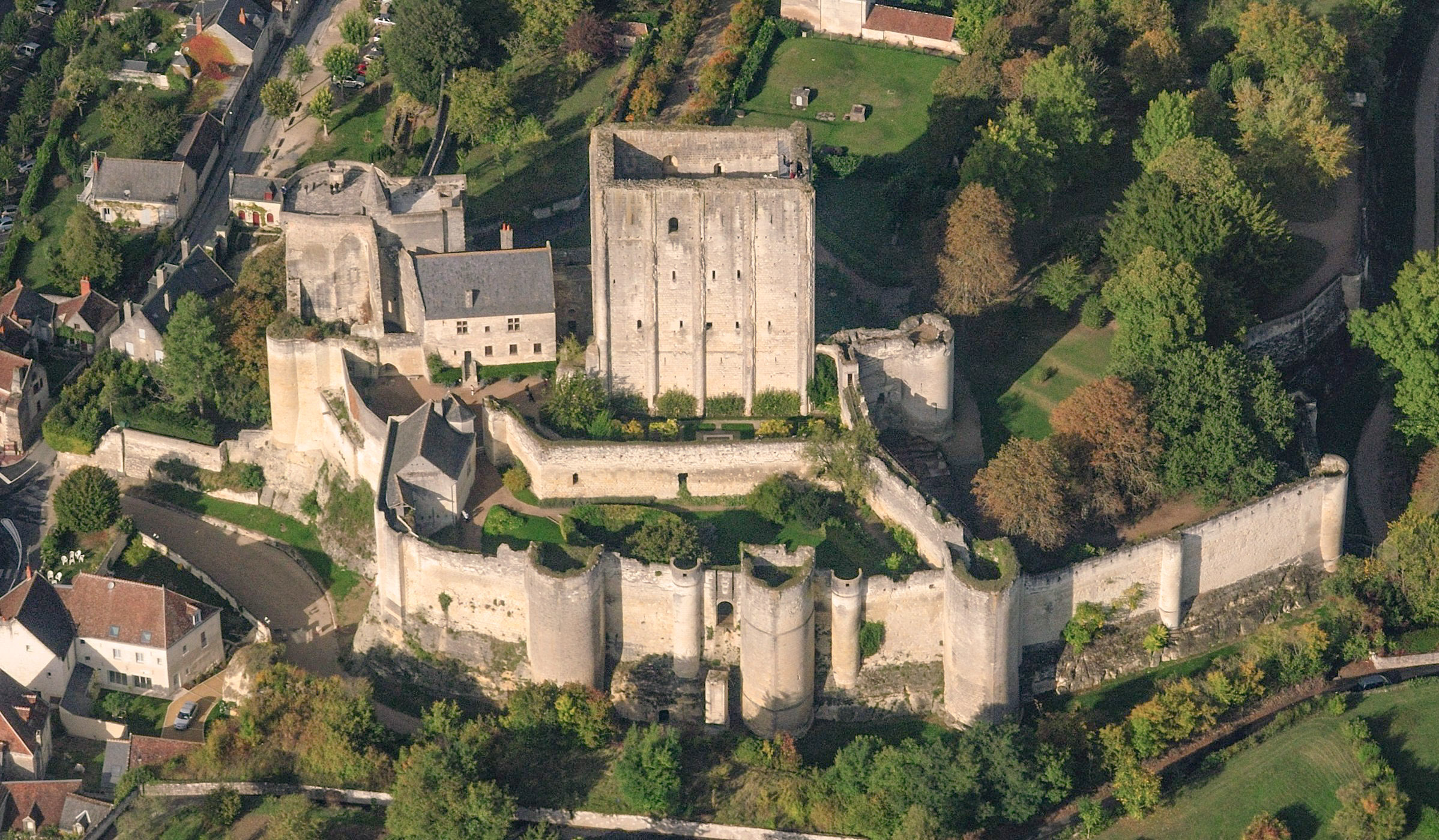
- Aerial view of Château de Loches
- Born: Touraine, France
- Other names: Gerardi de Athyes

Gérard d'Athée (written in the 1215 issue of Magna Carta as Gerardi de Athyes) was a principal military commander and lord from Athée-sur-Cher, near Tours, today in France. He possessed his own castle, arms and badge of "A Lion contrapasssant qui retourne ca tete" of Guyenne, Aquitaine, and that as used by King Richard I under whom he is first referenced. He later seamlessly transferred to King John from 1211 to 1215 following the death of Richard in 1199.

He served King John in France as commander of Loches castle, one of the last castles to resist the French king Philip II in Normandy. D'Athée was captured by the French and, being so highly valued by King John, ransomed back to England in return for 2,000 marks. He and his extended families and kinsmen were granted estates in England, and d'Athee was appointed High Sheriff of Gloucestershire and Herefordshire (1208–1210) and High Sheriff of Nottinghamshire, Derbyshire and the Royal Forests in 1209. His rapid rise in the English court caused resentment amongst the English barons. In 1215 his lands were confiscated and his family barred from any future land ownership by clause 50 of Magna Carta:

We will entirely remove from their bailiwicks, the relations of Gerard of Athee (so that in future they shall have no bailiwick in England); namely, Engelard of Cigogné, Peter, Guy, and Andrew of Chanceaux, Guy of Cigogné, Geoffrey of Martigny with his brothers, Philip Marc with his brothers and his nephew Geoffrey, and the whole brood of the same.
