= Ralph Mackerell =

Ralph Mackerell (died 1436) was an English landowner and Member of Parliament.

On his father's death he inherited an estate at Wilsthorpe, Nottinghamshire but also owned estates in a number of other Nottinghamshire manors.

He was appointed Sheriff of Nottinghamshire and Derbyshire for 1411, 1419 and 1422. He was Escheator for Nottinghamshire and Derbyshire for 1416-1417 and 1426 and deputy keeper of Nottingham castle from 1421. He was a justice of the peace for Nottinghamshire from 1422 to 1423.

He served as knight of the shire (MP) for Nottinghamshire in 1414, 1420 and 1428, although his last election was found to be in "contempt of the King".

He married twice: firstly Katherine, the daughter of Sir John Cressy of Hodsock Priory, Nottinghamshire, and sister and coheiress of Sir Hugh Cressy (c. 1375–1408), and widow of Sir John Clifton (d. 1403) of Clifton and secondly Margery, probably the daughter and coheiress of John Tansley.

He died in 1436 and was succeeded by his son Hugh, still a minor. The estates of his second wife reverted to his stepson Sir Gervase Clifton.
