= Anthony Eyre (sheriff) =

British landowner & politician (c.1691–1748)

High Sheriff of Nottinghamshire
- In office 1728–1729
- Preceded by: Richard Browne
- Succeeded by: Samuel Peak

Personal details
- Born: c. 1691
- Died: 1748
- Spouse: Margaret Turner (m. 1717; died 1748)
- Relations: Anthony Eyre (grandfather); John Eyre (grandson); George Eyre (grandson)
- Children: Anthony Eyre
- Parent(s): Gervase Eyre; Catherine Cooke

Anthony Eyre (c. 1691 – 1748) was an English landowner who served as High Sheriff of Nottinghamshire.

== Early life ==
Eyre was born in c. 1691. He was the eldest surviving son of Gervase Eyre Esq. of Rampton, Nottinghamshire, and Catherine Cooke (daughter and eventual heiress of Sir Henry Cooke, 2nd Baronet of Wheatley Hall). Among his siblings were Henry Eyre (father of Anne, who married the 1st Earl of Massereene), Capt. George Eyre of the Royal Horse Guards, Dr. Charles Eyre (father of Anthony Fountaine Eyre, Canon of York).

His paternal grandparents were Anthony Eyre and, his second wife, Elizabeth Pakington (a daughter of Sir John Pakington, 2nd Baronet). The Eyres were a branch of a prominent Derbyshire family that established themselves at Laughton-en-le-Morthen in South Yorkshire. Eyre's great-great-grandfather acquired a moiety of the manor of Rampton.

== Career ==
Eyre succeeded his father in 1704. He torn down the old family manor house at Rampton, near East Retford, and moved to the family's other residence at Laughton-en-le-Morthen, South Yorkshire. He also bought an estate at Adwick le Street, near Doncaster, from his uncle, Sir George Cooke, 3rd Baronet, in 1733, where he lived until his death.

He served as High Sheriff of Nottinghamshire in 1729.

== Personal life ==
On 23 December 1717, Eyre was married to Margaret Turner (d. 1748), daughter of Charles Turner Esq. of Kirk Leatham, Yorkshire. Together, they were the parents of:

- Gervase Eyre (1720–1741), who died unmarried.
- Anthony Eyre (1727–1788), an MP for Boroughbridge who married Judith Letitia Bury, a daughter of John Bury and the great-niece and heiress of Sir Hardolph Wasteneys, 4th Baronet, in 1755.
- Margaret Eyre (b. 1719), who married Bache Thornhill Esq. in 1742.
- Katherine Eyre (1721–1803), who married Matthew Dodsworth Esq. in 1758.
- Elizabeth Eyre (b. 1722), who married Chambers.
- Diana Eyre (b. 1723), who died unmarried.
- Mary Eyre (b. 1726), who married Anthony Cooke in 1752.

Eyre died in 1748 and was buried at Laughton.
