= Philip Marc =

English noble

Philip Marc (also Mark) was a High Sheriff of Nottinghamshire, Derbyshire and the Royal Forests in 1208. Marc has been proposed as a candidate for the role of Sheriff of Nottingham in the legend of Robin Hood.

== Biography ==
Marc is thought to have come from the French province of Touraine which is south of the Loire. This land had been lost by King John to King Philip II of France in 1204.

In 1207, Marc was ordered to collect 100 pounds from "three men of Newark". The nature of this task can be judged by a later demand he made for another 100 pounds from debtors in Lexington. The request was accompanied by a threat that they would be burnt to the ground. They had to pay if they wanted to "enjoy the King's peace". Sheriffs were appointed by the King (or Queen), but they were not paid. They took their profits from the confiscated lands that they had taken from debtors.

Marc was appointed Sheriff in 1208. In the seventh year of the reign of King John, Marc was given the bailiwick of Burton.

In 1214, Marc had a deputy named Eustace of Lowdham who may have already been working for him for five years. Like Marc himself, Eustace has been proposed as a contender for the Sheriff of Nottingham mentioned in the Robin Hood legends. However, there was no "Sheriff of Nottingham" until much later. Marc was the High Sheriff of Nottinghamshire and Derbyshire and the Royal Forests and Eustace was his deputy. Marc was not popular; he and his relatives have been judged a "bad lot". He and his relatives are specifically mentioned in the Magna Carta. At Runnymede, King John agreed to many clauses, but clause 50 specifically calls for the end of Marc.

"Item 50. We will entirely remove from their bailiwicks, the relations of Gerard of Athee (so that in future they shall have no bailiwick in England); namely, Engelard of Cigogné, Peter, Guy, and Andrew of Chanceaux, Guy of Cigogné, Geoffrey of Martigny with his brothers, Philip Mark with his brothers and his nephew Geoffrey, and the whole brood of the same."

Chronicler Matthew Paris described the hanging of 28 boy hostages from the walls of Nottingham Castle in 1212. During the rebellion, Eustace of Lowdham did not take the side of the King, but rather that of John de Lacy; in 1216 both the deputy and Marc made their peace with King John.

On 18 October 1216, Marc was named in the unusual appointment of Nicola de la Haye, as joint Sheriff of Lincolnshire. It is thought that following the rebellions, loyalty was so rare that the unlikely appointment of a woman was made at the end of the King's life.

Marc still held the post of Sheriff until he was replaced on 28 December 1217 by Ralph FitzNicholas, but it is thought that his role may have been actually carried out by Eustace as it was he who presents the accounts each year. However Marc did enjoy regional military powers.

== After ==
He married Ann and had a son who was still a child in 1222; as it has been noted that the roll of fines, that in the 6th year of the reign of the King, Philip Marc bought nine bovates of lands at Keyworth in Nottinghamshire which he gave with his body to Lenton Priory to be entombed. Marc left monies that his soul could be prayed for. His son Reginald was under age and he had one daughter, Petronella, who was the wife of Andrew Luteral. Oddly, King John had given the lands of Andrew's father, Geoffrey, to Philip Marc on the occasion of the marriage.

Lands were held at Chellaston near Derby for Marc's heirs. Reginald held lands at Thrumpton.

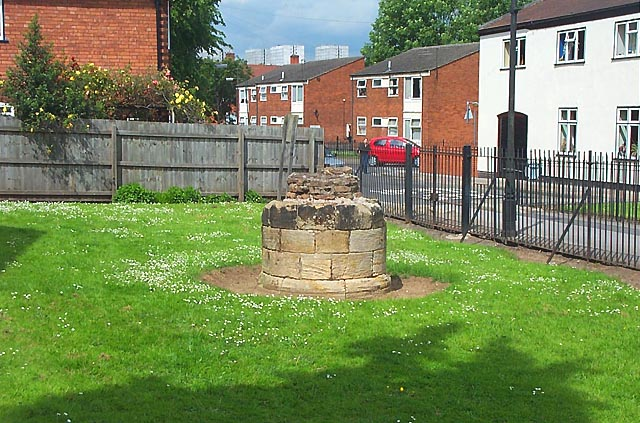
The remains of Lenton Priory where Philip Marc was buried

In 1226 Marc was given the manor of Barton le Street by the King who gave the same land in 1229 to Richard le Grey. In 1234, Brian de Lisle granted a pension to Ann, Philip's widow.

== In popular culture ==
A sympathetic portrayal of Marc as the Sheriff was presented in the Richard Kluger novel "The Sheriff of Nottingham". In this version Marc is portrayed as a good man who has to make hard choices in a thankless job.

Another, more villainous, version of Marc directly fought Robin Hood in the short story "The Walnut-Hued Man of Sutton Passeys" by Jean Rabe, part of the anthology "Warrior Fantastic". Eustace of Lowdham also makes an appearance as Marc's deputy.

A 1985 episode of the television drama Robin of Sherwood (entitled "The Sheriff of Nottingham", written by Anthony Horowitz) introduces "Philip Mark" as one of King John's enforcers. Marc is portrayed as a former sheriff of Lincolnshire, whose ruthlessness in completing his duties earned him a nickname: "the Butcher of Lincoln." As King John has grown tired of failures to capture Robin Hood by the series' fictional sheriff character, Robert de Rainault, Marc is appointed as his replacement. This version of Marc is portrayed as having a Saracen bodyguard named Sarak, and it is implied that Marc may have been active in the East during the Crusades. The character "Philip Mark" does not survive the end of the episode, and Robert de Rainault is restored to his role as sheriff. "Philip Mark" was played by Lewis Collins.

Honorary titles
| Preceded by Gérard D'Athée | High Sheriff of Nottinghamshire, Derbyshire and the Royal Forests; 1209–1224 | Succeeded by Ralph FitzNicholas |
| Preceded by unknown | High Sheriff of Lincolnshire; 1216–1217? With: Nichola de la Haye | Succeeded by Nichola de la Haye |
