= Francis Leke (MP) =

16th-century English politician

Francis Leke (fl. by 1510 – d. 1580) was an English politician.

He was a Member of the English Parliament for Derbyshire in 1539.In 1545, he was knighted following military service in France and in the north of England with the Earl of Hertford.In 1547 his parliamentary constituency was Newcastle-upon-Tyne.

He was appointed Sheriff of Nottinghamshire and Derbyshire for 1547–48 and Sheriff of Derbyshire for 1572–73.He married Elizabeth, the daughter of Sir William Paston of Caister and Oxnead, Norfolk. They had two sons and three daughters. In addition, Leke fathered two illegitimate sons.
