= HMS Magnificent (1806) =

Ship of the line of the Royal Navy

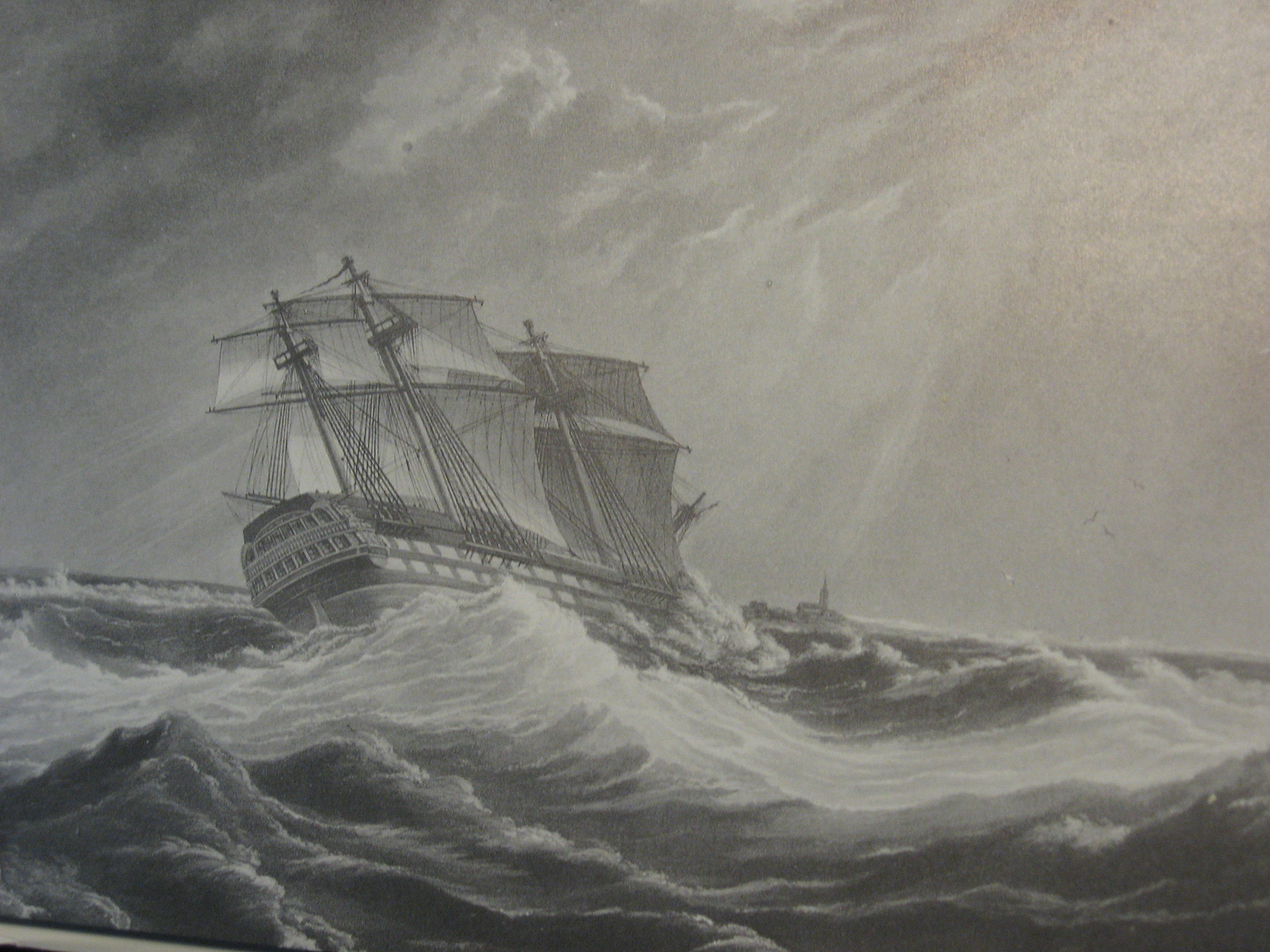
- A painting of Magnificent in a storm

History

United Kingdom
- Name: Magnificent
- Ordered: 31 January 1805
- Builder: Perry, Wells & Green, Blackwall Yard
- Laid down: April 1805
- Launched: 30 August 1806
- Commissioned: September 1806
- Fate: Sold, 1843

General characteristics
- Class & type: Repulse-class ship of the line
- Tons burthen: 1,732 3/94 (bm)
- Length: 174 ft 2 in (53.1 m) (gundeck)
- Beam: 47 ft 8 in (14.5 m)
- Draught: 18 ft 3 in (5.6 m) (light)
- Depth of hold: 20 ft (6.1 m)
- Sail plan: Full-rigged ship
- Complement: 590
- Armament: 74 muzzle-loading, smoothbore guns; Gundeck: 28 × 32 pdr guns; Upper deck: 28 × 18 pdr guns; Quarterdeck: 2 × 18 pdr guns + 12 × 32 pdr carronades; Forecastle: 2 × 18 pdr guns + 2 × 32 pdr carronades; Poop deck: 6 × 18 pdr carronades

HMS Magnificent was a 74-gun third-rate Repulse-class ship of the line built for the Royal Navy in the first decade of the 19th century. Completed in 1806, she played a minor role in the Napoleonic Wars.

== Description ==
Magnificent measured 174 feet 2 inches (53.1 m) on the gundeck and 143 feet 1 inch (43.6 m) on the keel. She had a beam of 47 feet 8 inches (14.5 m), a depth of hold of 20 feet (6.1 m) and had a tonnage of 1,732 3/94 tons burthen. The ship's draught was 13 feet 3 inches (4.0 m) forward and 18 feet 3 inches (5.6 m) aft at light load; fully loaded, her draught would be significantly deeper. The Repulse-class ships were armed with 74 muzzle-loading, smoothbore guns that consisted of twenty-eight 32-pounder guns on her lower gundeck and twenty-eight 18-pounder guns on her upper gundeck. Their forecastle mounted a pair of 18-pounder guns and two 32-pounder carronades. On their quarterdeck they carried two 18-pounders and a dozen 32-pounder carronades. Above the quarterdeck was their poop deck with half-a-dozen 18-pounder carronades. Their crew numbered 590 officers and ratings. The ships were fitted with three masts and ship-rigged.

== Construction and career ==
Magnificent was the second ship of her name to serve in the Royal Navy. She was ordered on 24 January 1805 from Perry, Wells & Green as part of the second batch of five Repulse-class ships of the line designed by Sir William Rule, co-Surveyor of the Navy. The ship was laid down at their shipyard in Blackwall Yard in April and was launched on 30 August 1806. She was commissioned by Captain George Eyre in September and completed at Woolwich Dockyard by 24 October.

On 21 March 1810, she participated in the expedition against the island of St Maura in the Adriatic.

From June to August 1812, she was off the coast of Northern Spain, in support of operations to expel Bonapartist forces from Spain. From 30 July to 1 August, she launched an attack on Santander.

She was among a convoy of vessels that had departed from Cork and Portsmouth in September, which arrived at Jamaica on 12 November 1814. With the departure of Vice Admiral Cochrane on 29 November 1814, she was the most senior vessel in Jamaica, her commanding officer Willoughby Lake was deputised to carry on the duties of Senior officer on the Jamaica station. She was among a convoy of vessels that had departed the West Indies on 1 May 1815, having paused at Havana, then stopped at Castletownbere on 3 July, arrived at Deal on 10 July 1815. She was paid off on 8 August 1815.

She was hulked in 1825, and eventually sold out of the service in 1843.

== Bibliography ==
- Colledge, J. J.; Warlow, Ben & Bush, Steve (2020). Ships of the Royal Navy: The Complete Record of all Fighting Ships of the Royal Navy from the 15th Century to the Present (5th revised and updated ed.). Seaforth Publishing. ISBN 978-1-5267-9327-0.
- James, William (1902). The naval history of Great Britain (1813–1827). Vol. 6 (New six volume ed.). London: Macmillan.
- Lavery, Brian (1984). The Ship of the Line. Vol. 1: The Development of the Battlefleet 1650–1850. Naval Institute Press. ISBN 0-85177-252-8.
- O'Byrne, William Richard (1849). "Lake, Willoughby Thomas" . A Naval Biographical Dictionary . John Murray – via Wikisource.
- Winfield, Rif (2008). British Warships in the Age of Sail 1793–1817: Design, Construction, Careers and Fates (2nd, revised ed.). Seaforth. ISBN 978-1-84415-717-4.
