= John II de Vaux of Cotham =

Sir John de Vaux of Cotham (died 1349) was a 14th-century English landowner who served as Sheriff of Nottinghamshire, Derbyshire and the Royal Forests. between.

== Life ==
John was the eldest son of John I de Vaux and his wife Constance. He was appointed on 18 November 1346, to the office of Sheriff of Nottinghamshire, Derbyshire and the Royal Forests.

Vaux married Sybil, and they had at a daughter, Margaret. John died while in office as sheriff shortly before 1 October 1349. The black plague was ravishing Nottinghamshire at the time. His heir was his daughter Margaret, who married Simon de Leeke, her third cousin in 1351. Margaret received a papal dispensation for the marriage.
