= Sheriff of Nottinghamshire, Derbyshire and the Royal Forests =

Ceremonial officer in England

The Sheriff of Nottinghamshire, Derbyshire and the Royal Forests is a position established by the Normans in England.

The sheriff is the oldest secular office under the Crown. Formerly the sheriff was the principal law enforcement officer in the county but over the centuries most of the responsibilities associated with the post have been transferred elsewhere or are now defunct, so that its functions are now largely ceremonial.

From 1068 until 1566 the position existed as Sheriff of Nottinghamshire, Derbyshire and the Royal Forests but after 1566 separate appointments were made as Sheriff of Derbyshire and Sheriff of Nottinghamshire.

== List of officeholders ==
This is a list of sheriffs in the period 1068–1568.

=== 11th–14th century ===
- 1068: William Peverel
- 1069–1080: Hugh fitzBaldric
- 1081–1087: Hugh de Port
- ?–1105: Richard fitz Gotse
- 1105: Helgot
- 1114: William I, Peveril
- 1125: Roger de Lovetot
- 1127–1129: Ivo de Hertz
- 1129: Osbert Sylvanus
- 1129–1153: William Peverel the Younger
- 1154: Osbert Sylvanus
- 1155–1156: Radulf son of Engelrami
- 1160–1164: Radulf son of Engelrami
- 1165–1168: Sir Robert FitzRanulph
- 1169–1176: William FitzRalph
- 1177: William FitzRalph and Serlo de Grendon
- 1178: Serlo de Grendon
- 1179: William FitzRalph ( also Seneschal of Normandy) and Serlo de Grendon
- 1180–1186: Radulf Murdac
- 1190–1191: Roger de Lacy
- 1191–1194: William de Wendenal
- 1194: William de Ferrers, 4th Earl of Derby (for seven weeks)
- 1194–1199: William Brewer
- 1200–1201: Hugh Bardulf and William de Lech
- 1202: Hugh Bardulf and Reginald de Karduil
- 1203–1208: Robert de Vieuxpont, Richard De Bello Campo (Richard Beauchamp)
- 1208: Gérard d'Athée and Philip Marc
- 1209–1211: Philip Marc and Peter Markes
- 1212: Philip Marc and Eustace De Ludham (Sheriff of Yorkshire 1225).
- 1216–1221: Philip Marc
- 1222–1224: Ralph Fitz Nicholas
- 1225–1232: Ralph Fitz Nicholas and Hugo le Bell
- 1233–1234: Ralph Fitz Nicholas and William le Derley
- 1232: Eustace de Ludham
- 1234: Brian de Lisle (Also castellan of Knaresborough (Yorkshire) in 1205, Sheriff of Yorkshire in 1206 and succeeded Robert de Vieuxpont in charge of the Archbishopric of York).
- 1236–1239: Hugh Fitz Ralph and Robert de Vavasour, Lord of Bilborough
- 1240–1241: William de Cantilupe and Baldwin de Pannton
- 1242–1246: Baldwin de Pannton
- 1247–1254: Robert de Vavasor
- 1255: Sir Walter De Eastwood, then from May 1258 Roger de Lovetot.
- 1256–1257: Roger de Lunetal
- 1258–1259: Simon De Heydon
- 1260: Simon de Asselacton (Aslockton)
- 1261–1262: John de Balliol and Simon de Heydon
- 1263–1264: William, son of Herbert and son Henry
- 1265–1269: Reginald de Grey, 1st Baron Grey de Wilton and Hugh de Stapleford.
- 1267: Simon de Hedon but from Michaelmas, Gerard his son and Hugh de Stapleford.
- 1270–1271: Hugh de Stapleford and Walter, Archbishop of York.
- 1271: Hugh de Babbington (Under Sheriff to Walter, Archbishop of York)
- 1272: Walter Giffard, archbishop of York.
- 1274: Walter de Stirclerle or Stirkelegh.
- 1278: Reginald de Grey, 1st Baron Grey de Wilton, but from (Michaelmas), Gervasse de Willesford and John de Anesle.
- 1279–1283: Sir Gervase Clifton (d.1323) of Clifton Hall, Nottingham
- 1285: John de Anesle
- 1290: Gervase de Clifton but from (Michaelmas) William de Chaddewich and Hugh de Stapelford.
- 1291: William de Chaworth
- 1293: Phillip of Paunton
- 1295: Walter de Goushill of Hoveringham
- 1297: John de Harrington
- 1298: Ralph de Shirley
- 1300: Richard de Furneaux
- 1301: Ralph de Shirley
- 1303: Petrus Picott
- 1307: Willielmus de Chellasdeston (Chellaston).
- 1308: Petrus Picott Willielmus de Chellasdeston.
- 1309: Johannes de Strichesley.
- 1310: Thomas de Swyneford.
- 1311: Radulphus de Crophulle.
- 1312: Johannes de la Beche.
- 1313: Radulphus de Crophulle.
- 1315: Johannes de Bella Fide (John Beaufie)
- 1318: Henry de Fauconberg (1st term)(Sheriff of Yorkshire 1323–27)
- 1319: Hugo de Stokes. Henricus de Fauconbridge.
- 1320–1322: Sir John Darcy
- 1322: Robert Ingram
- 1323: Henry de Fauconberg (2nd term)
- 1324: Sir Ralph de Braylesford of Brailsford, Derbyshire
- 1327: Robert Ingram.
- 1329: Thomas de Longvillers.
- 1329: Henry Fauconberg (3rd term) and Edmund de Cressy
- 1330: Johannes Bret
- 1331: Robertus de Joice
- 1334: Johannes de Oxon.
- 1338: Egidius de Meynell.
- 1341: Hugo de Hercy.
- 1342: Nicholaus de Longford.
- 1344: Johannes de Musters.
- 1345: Gervase de Clifton (1313–1391) of Clifton Hall, Nottingham
- 1346: Thomas de Bekeringe.
- 1347: Johannes de Vaux.
- 1350: Johannes Walleys.
- 1362: Robert Morton.
- 1381: John Bosun
- 1383: Sir John Leake
- 1385: John Gateford of Gateford
- 1387: Sir John Leake
- 1389: Sir Robert Fraunceys
- 1391: Sir Nicholas Montgomery of Marston Montgomery
- 1391: John Gateford of Gateford
- 1393: Sir John Leake
- 1393: Thomas Rempstone
- 1396: John Gateford of Gateford
- 1397–1399: Robert Morton of Harworth
- 1399: Sir John Leake
- John de Keynes

=== 15th century ===
- 24 November 1400: Roger Leche
- 8 November 1401: John Gateford
- 30 November 1401: William Sallowe
- 29 November 1402: Sir John Clifton
- 2 August 1403: Hugh Cressy, of Oldcoates
- 5 November 1403: Thomas Chaworth, of Wiverton, Notts. and Alfreton, Derbys.
- 22 October 1404: Sir Roger Stanhope
- 22 November 1405: Roger Bradbourne, of Bradbourne
- 27 January 1406: Sir Nicholas Montgomery, of Marston Montgomery
- 5 November 1406: Sir Robert Fraunceys
- 23 November 1407: Sir John Burton
- 15 November 1408: William Rigmaiden
- 29 November 1409: Sir Nicholas Montgomery, of Marston Montgomery
- 10 December 1411: Ralph Mackerell, of Wilsthorpe, Derbys. and Clifton, Notts.
- 3 November 1412: William Rigmaiden
- 6 November 1413: Sir Nicholas Montgomery, the elder, of Marston Montgomery
- Michaelmas 1414: Thomas Hercy
- 1415: Thomas Buxton
- 1 December 1415: Simon Leek, of Leake and Cotham
- 30 November 1416: William Rigmaiden
- 10 November 1417: Sir Thomas Chaworth, of Wiverton, Notts. and Alfreton, Derbys.
- 4 November 1418: Sir Thomas Gresley, of Drakelow
- 23 November 1419: Ralph Mackerell, of Wilsthorpe, Derbys. and Clifton, Notts.
- 16 November 1420: Sir Ralph Shirley, of Shirley, Derbys. and Ratcliffe-upon-Soar, Notts
- 1 May 1422: Ralph Mackerell, of Wilsthorpe, Derbys. and Clifton, Notts.
- 14 February 1423: Sir John Cockayne, of Ashbourne, Derbyshire
- 13 November 1423: Sir Thomas Chaworth, of Wiverton, Notts. and Alfreton, Derbys.
- 6 November 1424: Sir Richard Vernon, of Haddon Hall
- 12 December 1426: Sir Thomas Gresley, of Drakelow
- 15 January 1426: Sir John Zouche, of Kirklington, Notts
- 7 November 1427: Norman Babington, of Dethick Manor
- 4 November 1428: Sir John Cockayne, of Ashbourne, Derbyshire
- 10 February 1430: John Cockfield
- 5 November 1430: Sir Hugh Willoughby, of Risley
- 1432: Sir Nicholas Montgomery
- 1433: William Mereing
- 1434: Sir Robert Markham
- 1435: Sir John Cockayne of Ashbourne, Derbyshire
- 1436: Thomas Darcy of Newhall
- 1437: John Curzon of Kedleston
- 1438: John Hickling
- 1439: William Mereing
- 1440: John Cockfeld
- 1441: Thomas Stanton
- 1442: J Walbeys
- 1443: J Pole of Radbourne Hall
- 1444: Thomas Nevil
- 1445: J Stathum
- 1446: Robert Strelley
- 1447: Thomas Blount
- 1448: Nicholas Fitzherbert of Norbury Hall
- 1449: Thomas Stanton
- 1450: Richard Willoughby
- 1451: Robert Clifton of Clifton Hall, Nottingham
- 1452: Robert Strelley
- 1453: Sir William Plumpton of Hassop Hall
- 1454: Sir John Gresley of Gresley
- 1455: John Stanhope of Shelford, Nottinghamshire
- 1456: William Babington
- 1457: John Wastneis of Hendon
- 1458: W Chaworth of Wiverton, Nottinghamshire
- 1459: William Fitzherbert of Norbury Hall
- 1460: Sir Robert Clifton of Clifton Hall, Nottingham
- 1461: Richard Willoughby
- 1462: Sir John Stanhope of Shelford, Nottinghamshire
- 1463: Sir John Stanhope of Shelford, Nottinghamshire
- 1464: Sir Robert Strelley
- 1465: Phillip Okeover of Okeover Hall
- 1466: Nicholas Fitzherbert of Norbury Hall
- 1467: Nicholas Kniveton of Mercaston Hall
- 1468: Sir Robert Clifton of Clifton Hall, Nottingham
- 1469: Sir Henry Pierrepont of Holme Pierrepont Hall
- 1470: William Blount
- 11 April 1471: Sir Henry Pierrepont, of Holme Pierrepont Hall
- 9 November 1471: Gervas Clifton
- 9 November 1472: John Curzon, of Kedleston Hall
- 5 November 1473: Phillip Okeover, of Okeover Hall
- 1475: Sir Henry Statham of Morley
- 1476: William Basset of Brailsford
- 1477: Ralph de la Pole of Radbourne Hall
- 1478: Gervas Clifton of Clifton Hall, Nottingham
- 1479: John Babington of Dethick Manor
- 1480: Sir Robert Markham
- 1481: Robert Eyre of Padley Hall
- 1482: Charles Pilkington
- 1483: Sir Gervas Clifton of Clifton Hall, Nottingham
- 1484: John Curzon of Kedleston Hall
- 1485: Sir John Curzon of Kedleston Hall
- 1486: Sir John Byron
- 1487: Sir John Curzon of Kedleston Hall
- 1488: Sir Gervas Clifton of Clifton Hall, Nottingham
- 1489: John Leek of Sutton
- 1490: Nicholas Kniveton of Mercaston Hall
- 1492: Sir James Savage
- 1493: Nicholas Byron
- 1494: Nicholas Kniverton jun. of Mercaston Hall
- 1495: Bri Stamford
- 1496: Sir Henry Willoughby of Risley
- 1497: Sir Rad Shirley of Shirley
- 1498: Thomas Babington of Dethick Manor
- 1499: William Bothe

=== 16th century to 1568 ===
- 1500: Humphrey Hercy of Grove Hall, Nottinghamshire
- 1501: Sir Ralph Longford of Longford Hall
- 1502: Sir Gervas Clifton of Clifton Hall, Nottingham
- 1503: William Pierrepont
- 1504: Sir Henry Vernon of Haddon Hall
- 1505: Simon Digby
- 1506: Sir William Merering
- 1507: Sir William Merering
- 1508: Sir Edward Stanhope of Rampton Manor, Rampton, Nottinghamshire
- 1509: Sir Edward Stanhope of Rampton Manor, Rampton, Nottinghamshire
- 1510: Sir Br. Stapulton
- 1511: William Zouch
- 1512: Richard Bassett
- 1513: George Chaworth
- 1514: Roger Mynors of Duffield
- 1515: Sir William Mereing
- 1516: Sir John Zouch
- 1517: Robert Brown
- 1518: Sir Br. Stapulton
- 1519: Sir John Markham I of Cotham
- 1520: Sir Godfrey Foljambe of Walton Hall, Chesterfield
- 1521: Sir John Cockayne of Ashbourne
- 1522: Sir William Pierrepoint
- 1523: Sir John Byron of Colwick and Newstead Abbey
- 1524: Sir John Vernon
- 1525: Sir Godfrey Foljambe of Walton Hall, Chesterfield
- 1526: Sir John Markham I of Cotham
- 1527: Sir John Vernon of Haddon Hall
- 1528: Sir John Byron of Colwick and Newstead Abbey
- 1529: Nicholas Strelley
- 1530: Sir Thomas Cockayne
- 1531: Sir Henry Sacheveral
- 1532: Sir William Coffin
- 1533: John Hercy of Grove Hall, Nottinghamshire
- 1534: Sir John Markham I of Cotham
- 1534: Sir Anthony Babington of Dethick Manor
- 1535: Sir Rad. Longford
- 1536: Sir Godfrey Foljambe of Walton Hall, Chesterfield
- 1537: Sir Nicholas Strelley
- 1538: Sir John Markham II of Cotham
- 1539: Sir William Bassett
- 1540: Sir Gervase Clifton of Clifton Hall, Nottingham
- 1541: Sir Henry Sacheveral
- 1542: Sir John Byron of Colwick and Newstead Abbey
- 1543: John Hercy of Grove Hall, Nottinghamshire
- 1544: John Zouch
- 1545: Sir John Markham II of Cotham
- 1546: Sir Gervase Clifton of Clifton Hall, Nottingham
- 1547: Francis Leek
- 1548: Sir John Hercy of Grove Hall, Nottinghamshire
- 1549: Sir Thomas Cokayne of Ashbourne
- 1550: Sir Henry Sutton of Arundel
- 1551; Sir John Byron of Colwick and Newstead Abbey
- 1552: Sir Anthony Nevill
- 1553: Sir John Port of Etwall
- 1554: Sir Gervase Clifton of Clifton Hall, Nottingham
- 1555: Sir James Foljambe of Walton Hall, Chesterfield
- 1556: Sir John Charworth of Wiverton
- 1557: Sir William Holles of Houghton
- 1558: George Pierrepont of Holme Pierrepont Hall
- 1559: Sir Thomas Cokayne of Ashbourne
- 1560: Sir William Mering of Barton Park
- 1561: Sir John Zouch of Codnor Castle
- 1562: Sir Thomas Stanhope of Elvaston Castle
- 1563: Sir Humphrey Bradbourn of Hough
- 1564: Francis Molineux of Teversal Manor, Nottinghamshire
- 1565: Sir Thomas Gerrard of Hilderstone
- 1566: Godfrey Foljambe of Aldwark
- For Sheriffs after 1566 see High Sheriff of Nottinghamshire and High Sheriff of Derbyshire

== Bibliography ==
- Hughes, A. (1898). List of Sheriffs for England and Wales from the Earliest Times to A.D. 1831. London: Eyre & Spottiswoode.
