= George Eyre =

Royal Navy officer (1769–1839)

Vice-Admiral Sir George Eyre KCB KCMG
- Born: 23 April 1769; Grove, Nottinghamshire
- Died: 15 February 1839; Carlton, Derbyshire
- Military career
- Allegiance: Great Britain; United Kingdom
- Branch: Royal Navy
- Service years: 1782–1839
- Rank: Vice-Admiral of the Red
- Commands: HMS Speedy; HMS Albacore; HMS Prompte; HMS Regulus; HMS San Josef; HMS Ardent; HMS Magnificent
- Conflicts: American Revolutionary War; French Revolutionary Wars; Siege of Toulon; Napoleonic Wars; Adriatic campaign of 1807–1814
- Awards: Knight Commander of the Order of the Bath; Knight Commander of the Order of St Michael and St George

Vice-Admiral Sir George Eyre KCB KCMG (23 April 1769 – 15 February 1839) was an officer of the Royal Navy who saw service during the American War of Independence and the French Revolutionary and Napoleonic Wars, eventually rising to the rank of Vice-Admiral of the Red.

Eyre served with James King in the Caribbean during the American War of Independence, seeing action in a number of engagements. With the conclusion of the war, he was based at times at Halifax, and later off the South American coast and in the Mediterranean. With the outbreak of the French Revolutionary Wars, Eyre served in the Mediterranean and was involved in the Siege of Toulon, before being given his first command, the 14-gun brig-sloop HMS Speedy. The command was short-lived, and Speedy was chased down and captured by a large French fleet. Taken into captivity, Eyre and his men endured harsh conditions until being exchanged back to Britain. Acquitted for the loss of his ship and given a new command, Eyre went out to the West Indies, but returned to Britain in 1799 and saw little further employment until 1806, when he joined the Mediterranean fleet and was active off the coast of Spain, supporting Spanish resistance to the French.

In 1809, he went to the Adriatic and took part in the campaign there, helping to capture several islands. He launched an assault on Santa Maura and was wounded during the operations. After participating in the blockade of Corfu he returned to the Spanish coast and resumed operations there in support of the Spanish partisans. Returning to England again in 1811, he went ashore and was not actively employed for the rest of the Napoleonic Wars, though he received a knighthood and was later appointed a Knight Commander of the Order of the Bath. He returned to service in 1823, commanding the South American station during a time of particular diplomatic difficulties, and on returning home in 1826 retired ashore owing to illness. He died in 1839.

== Family and early life ==
George Eyre was born the fourth and youngest son of politician Anthony Eyre, who had represented the constituency of Boroughbridge in a number of parliaments, and his wife, Judith Laetitia Bury. George's elder brother, Anthony Hardolph Eyre, also entered politics and represented Nottinghamshire during the 1800s. George attended Harrow School and after spending several months at an academy in Chelsea, entered the navy in 1782. His first ship was the 44-gun HMS Resistance, under the command of Captain James King. They went out to Jamaica escorting a convoy, and remained in the area for the rest of the American War of Independence.

On 2 March 1783, while sailing in company with HMS Duguay Trouin, two ships were discovered anchored in Turks Island passage. On being spotted the two ships cut their cables and stood to the southwest, upon which Resistance promptly gave chase. The rearmost ship, carrying 20 guns, sprang her main topmast, and surrendered after Resistance came up and fired a broadside. She then gave chase to the other, carrying 28 guns, and after enduring fire from her stern chasers, came alongside and the Frenchman promptly surrendered. The ships were discovered to be two transports that had taken troops to Turks Island, garrisoning it with 530 men. One of the ships, the 28-gun Coquette was commanded by the Marquis de Grasse, nephew of the Comte de Grasse. One or two days later Resistance fell in with a small squadron under Captain Horatio Nelson, consisting of HMS Albemarle, HMS Tartar, HMS Drake and the armed ship Barrington. Nelson decided to attack the recently garrisoned Turks Island, and 250 men were landed under the cover of supporting fire from the ships. The French were found to be heavily entrenched, and the British withdrew after being unable to dislodge them.

With the end of the war Eyre returned to England with King aboard HMS Diamond, but soon rejoined the Resistance and went out to Halifax to join Sir Charles Douglas. As Douglas' flagship spent most of her time in port, Eyre was sent out to cruise on other ships, including HMS Mercury under Captain Stanhope, and HMS Atalanta under Captain Thomas Foley. Eyre returned to Britain with Resistance in 1786, and the following year joined the 44-gun HMS Adventure under Captain Francis Parry. Parry went out as commodore to Guinea, but ill-health obliged him to resign his command, and Eyre went to Newfoundland aboard Captain Trigge's HMS Nautilus. Eyre joined Admiral Lord Howe's flagship HMS Queen Charlotte during the Spanish Armament, and in November 1790 was promoted to lieutenant. He then joined HMS Scipio under Captain Edward Thornbrough, and after Scipio was paid off, HMS Aquilon under Captain Robert Stopford, in which he sailed to the Mediterranean.

== French Revolutionary Wars ==
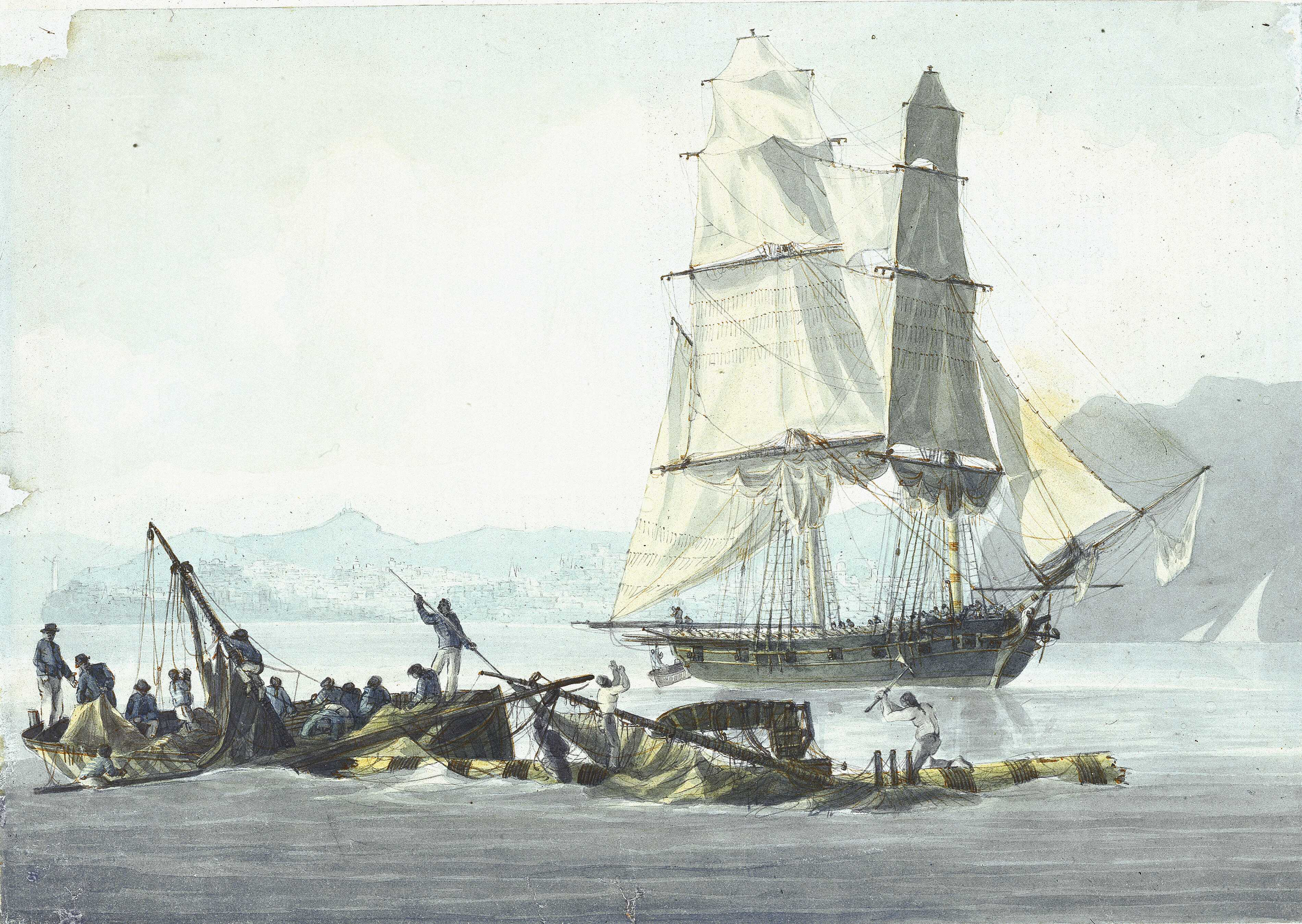
HMS Speedy, Eyre's short-lived command

On the outbreak of war with France in 1793 Eyre was appointed to HMS St George, the flagship of Rear-Admiral John Gell, a relation of Eyre's. He was present at the capture of a French privateer and her Spanish registered prize St Jago. St George went on to join Admiral Lord Hood's fleet at Gibraltar, and went with him to Toulon. Eyre took an active part in the Siege of Toulon, volunteering to command the detachment of marines landed from St George and sent to defend Fort La Malgue. He went from there to command the battery at Fort Pharon, and after some time attracted Hood's attention with his good service. Hood appointed him to his flagship HMS Victory. After the fall of Toulon and the British evacuation he was advanced to commander and appointed to command the sloop HMS Speedy, succeeding Commander George Cockburn, who had been appointed to command HMS Inconstant. He assisted in the capture of Bastia, and was then ordered to join HMS Diadem off Nice.

=== Capture ===
While making his way there he ran into the French fleet on 9 June, the French having sailed from Toulon some days earlier and headed east along the coast. Despite pressing on sail Speedy was overrun and captured. Eyre was taken aboard one of the French ships, and later transferred to the flagship of the fleet's commander, Rear-Admiral Pierre Martin. Martin asked him if he had heard of the decree from the National Convention which declared that 'no quarter should be given to either the English or the Hanoverians'. Eyre replied that they had not, on which he was told by Martin that "...I must tell you that it is now un guerre à mort [a war to the death]; and if I had been the first to come alongside of you, I should have instantly sent you to the bottom." At this point the main British fleet was seen approaching, and Eyre was hurried back to the first ship he had been brought onto, and the French hurried into Gourjean roads, taking Speedy and the captured British crew with them.^{[a]}

Eyre and the crew were landed and marched to Antibes, where they were imprisoned with the crew of a Sardinian frigate that had been captured the day before Speedy. The crew had been imprisoned on Martin's flagship Sans Culotte and had been severely treated, with their captain, Ross, not being allowed to wash or shave. The British were placed in a dungeon at Antibes, with only straw to lie on, awaiting the decision of the authorities. After three weeks in this state, they were marched to Aix-en-Provence and were confined in the prison there. After a month imprisoned in Aix, Maximilien Robespierre fell and the Reign of Terror came to an end. The British were paroled. Eyre and the officers were taken to Romans, in Dauphiné where Eyre remained until May 1795 when he was released in exchange for a French officer. He faced a court-martial for the loss of Speedy, but was honourably acquitted.^{[b]}

=== West Indies ===
Eyre was next appointed to command the sloop HMS Albacore, before being made post-captain on 6 June 1796 and given command of the 20-gun HMS Prompte. He went out with Sir Hugh Cloberry Christian to the West Indies and took part in the reduction of Saint Lucia. While there he was appointed by Sir Hyde Parker to command the 44-gun HMS Regulus and carried out a number of cruises, capturing several prizes and winning himself riches and recognition. While cruising off Puerto Rico on 11 July 1798 Eyre located five merchant ships at anchor under a shore battery at Aguada, and decided to attempt to capture or destroy them. The ship's boats were sent in under Lieutenants Good and Holman while Regulus and a prize schooner stood close by to support them. The wind failed however, and neither ship could get near enough to support them, but Lieutenant Good pressed on, and boarded the ships. With no wind he was unable to bring them all out, and so destroyed the two he was unable to sail out. British casualties, despite being under fire for the whole operation, amounted to one man wounded. Eyre returned to Britain in September 1799, transporting Vice-Admiral Richard Rodney Bligh.

== Napoleonic Wars ==
=== Spanish coast ===
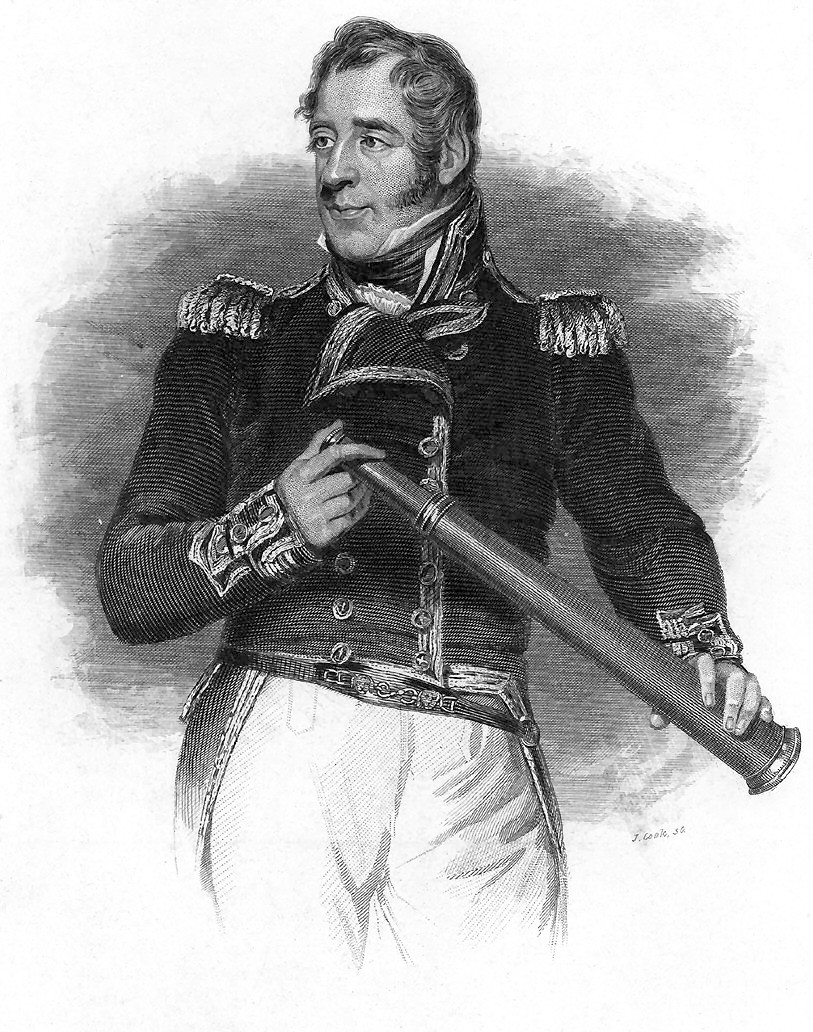
Lord Cochrane, a later commander of Eyre's first command Speedy. Eyre helped to evacuate his garrison from Roses.

Eyre was then unemployed for a while, with the exception of a brief period in temporary command of HMS San Josef from 11 February to 18 March 1801, succeeding Thomas Hardy and in turn being succeeded by William Wolseley. He finally received a posting in July 1806 when he was appointed to the 64-gun HMS Ardent, but was soon moved to command the newly built 74-gun HMS Magnificent. Magnificent initially served with the Channel Fleet, which was then under Admiral Lord St Vincent, before going out to the Bay of Biscay with Sir Eliab Harvey's squadron. Eyre moved to the Mediterranean in June 1807, coming under Lord Collingwood's orders while stationed off Cádiz. With the Spanish rising on 2 May 1808 and the surrender of the French squadron in Cádiz on 14 June, Collingwood sent Eyre to patrol off Toulon. Shortly afterwards he was sent to Roses to support the Spanish there, and several days later evacuated Lord Cochrane and his garrison from Fort Trinidad.^{[c]}

=== Adriatic ===
Eyre was next appointed by Lord Collingwood to take command of the squadron in the Adriatic in April 1809, a command that then consisted of three ships of the line and seven or eight frigates. In October 1810 he was sent with Magnificent, HMS Belle Poule and HMS Kingfisher to join Captain John William Spranger's squadron and assist in the capture of Cephalonia, Zante and Cerigo, part of a long running campaign in the Adriatic. Santa Maura initially remained in French hands, and became a base for small cruisers which were an annoyance to the British forces. Eyre resolved to attack and capture it and together with General John Oswald and troops of the 35th Regiment of Foot made a landing on 22 March 1810. The French withdrew to a citadel, protected by three redoubts, which the British attacked. During the heavy fighting Eyre was hit in the head by a musket ball and knocked to the ground, narrowly avoiding death as three other balls passed through his clothing. Eyre handed over command of the expedition to Captain James Brisbane of HMS Belle Poule while he recovered, and was well enough to resume command on 25 March. The British forced the French to surrender on 16 April, the British casualties being seven dead and 39 wounded. Eyre was personally thanked by Admirals Sir George Martin and Sir Charles Cotton, and the Lords of the Admiralty.

With the islands secure Eyre enforced the blockade of Corfu. On 6 February 1811 he encountered an enemy relief convoy bound from Otranto to Corfu, consisting of 25 ships. Eyre captured 22 of them, carrying grain, ordnance and 500 troops. Eyre also stationed several frigates in the northern part of the Adriatic under the command of Captain William Hoste. Hoste went on to win a significant victory over a French squadron under Bernard Dubourdieu at the Battle of Lissa. Eyre spent a total of two years commanding the station, the time spent almost constantly at sea, only briefly putting into port to refit and replenish supplies. He was succeeded in the post by Captain Charles Rowley and went to join the fleet of Toulon. On the occasion of his departure his subordinate, James Brisbane wrote

My dear Commodore, - It is with the sincerest pleasure that I hasten to execute the wishes of my brother officers, of informing you, in the name of all of us who lately served under you in the blockade of Corfu, that we have sent directions to England to have a small piece of plate prepared, which we request your acceptance of, not for its value, but as a testimonial of our high esteem and affectionate regard, and a memorial of the happiness which we experienced while serving under your orders. Ever, my dear commodore, yours, with great regard, most faithfully and sincerely,

— James Brisbane, Belle Poule, Malta, June 1, 1811

=== Return to Spain ===
The Mediterranean fleet was by now under Sir Edward Pellew, and Eyre was sent to the Spanish coast to support the Spanish forces fighting the French. Eyre was particularly active off the coast of Valencia and evacuated the garrison of Oropesa del Mar, earning the thanks of General Joaquín Blake y Joyes. On being ordered back to England in 1811 Pellew also wrote a private letter of thanks, following on from his earlier declaration that 'I have to express my complete approbation of Captain Eyre's methods, and have much satisfaction of employing the services of that most excellent officer in the aid of the Valencia patriots.' Eyre arrived in England in 1812, his health having been affected by his five years on a foreign station, and requested and received permission to go ashore. As a mark of his services in the Adriatic and off Spain he was knighted by King George III. Eyre was appointed a Colonel of Marines on 4 June 1814 and was nominated as a Knight Commander of the Order of the Bath following the expansion of the order on 12 January 1815.

== Flag rank and South America ==
Eyre was promoted to rear-admiral on 12 August 1819 and shortly afterwards received an offer from Lord Melville to take command of the Cape and St Helena stations, but was unable to accept owing to matters of a personal nature. In 1823 he was able to accept the offer of the command of the South American station, at a time when several of the former Spanish colonies were declaring independence. Eyre was able to successfully manage delicate diplomatic and military duties, and was able to protect British rights and possessions in the area during periods of upheaval. His actions in the region included signing treaties with Spain and Portugal involving the prevention of illegal slave trafficking. He stepped down after the expiration of his posting and was succeeded by Admiral Sir Robert Otway.

== Family and later life ==
Eyre returned to Britain, arriving at Spithead on 10 December 1826, and was almost immediately offered command of a squadron fitting out for Lisbon. The changes in climate had brought on an attack of gout, and on being informed that as Sir Thomas Hardy's squadron was already on the spot, he was at liberty to refuse the offer. Eyre did so, and retired ashore. He appears to have had no further commands, and was advanced to vice-admiral in 1830. He had married Georgiana Cooke, the daughter of Sir George Cooke, 7th Baronet, at Doncaster on 1 November 1800, with whom he had a family of eight children, including two sons named George-Hardolf and William. Sir George Eyre died on 15 February 1839 at the rectory, Carlton, Derbyshire.

== Notes ==
a. The defeat of the French fleets by Lord Howe at the Glorious First of June and the subsequent acquisition of large numbers of French prisoners caused the French to abandon the policy of guerre à mort, lest their own men also be shown no quarter.
b. Speedy was retaken on 25 March 1795 by Captain Thomas Fremantle's HMS Inconstant, and went on to serve under a number of commanders, including Jahleel Brenton, and Hugh Downman, and won particular fame under Lord Cochrane, before her final loss to a French fleet on 3 July 1801. She went on to serve with the French and Papal navies until being broken up in 1807.
c. Magnificent arrived on 2 December in company with the bomb vessel HMS Lucifer (1803), joining HMS Meteor, HMS Fame and HMS Imperieuse. Cochrane and the garrison were evacuated on 5 December.
