= Gervase Eyre =

English politician (1669–1704)

Gervase Eyre DL (1669 – 16 February 1704) was an English MP for Nottinghamshire.

== Early life ==
Eyre was the son of Anthony Eyre of Rampton, Nottinghamshire and his second wife Elizabeth Pakington, daughter of Sir John Pakington, 2nd Baronet, of Westwood, Worcestershire. He was educated at Christ Church, Oxford and trained in the law at the Inner Temple (1686). He succeeded his father in 1671 at the age of two.

== Career ==
Eyre was appointed as a Deputy Lieutenant of Nottinghamshire in 1692 and as High Sheriff of Nottinghamshire for 1696–97. He was elected a knight of the shire (MP) for Nottinghamshire in 1698 and was re-elected in 1702.

== Personal life ==
He married Catherine Cooke, the daughter and eventual heiress of Sir Henry Cooke, 2nd Baronet of Wheatley. Together, they were the parents of seven sons and six daughters, including:

- Anthony Eyre (c. 1691–1748), who married Margaret Turner, daughter of Charles Turner of Kirkleatham.
- Henry Eyre (b. 1693), who married Elizabeth Hickham.
- Susanna Eyre (d. 1766)
- Elizabeth Eyre (1688–1761)
- Dorothy Eyre (1690–1698), who died young.
- Catherine Eyre (1692–1723)
- Dorothy Eyre (c. 1700–1719), who died unmarried.
- Diana Eyre (c. 1702–1763)

Eyre died in London in 1704 and was buried in the chancel of All Saints' church, Rampton. He was succeeded by his son Anthony.

=== Descendants ===
Through his son Henry, he was a grandfather of Anne Eyre (c. 1717–1805), who married Clotworthy Skeffington, 1st Earl of Massereene; Captain George Eyre (1695–1761) of the Royal Horse Guards; Gervase Eyre (c. 1697–1741); and Dr. Charles Eyre (1700–1763), who married Elizabeth Fountaine and was the father of Anthony Fountaine Eyre, Canon of York.
