= Anthony Eyre (Nottinghamshire MP) =

English politician (1634–1671)

Anthony Eyre JP (baptised 17 September 1634 – November 1671) was an English politician who sat in the House of Commons from 1661 to 1671.

== Early life ==
Eyre was baptised on 17 September 1634. He was the second, but only surviving, son of Sir Gervase Eyre of Laughton-en-le-Morthen, Yorkshire, and his wife Elizabeth Babington, daughter of John Babington of Rampton, Nottinghamshire. His father was killed in 1645 defending Newark Castle for the King in the English Civil War. After his father's death, his mother married William More D.D.

His father was the eldest son of the former Anne Markham and Anthony Eyre, of Laughton-en-le-Morthen and Kiveton, Yorkshire, and Newbold, Derbyshire.

He was educated at Inner Temple in 1654, and was awarded a M.A. from Oxford University in 1663.

== Career ==
In 1660, Eyre was appointed a Justice of the Peace for Nottinghamshire. He was returned as Member of Parliament for Nottinghamshire at the 1661 general election to the Cavalier Parliament. He held the seat until his death in 1671.

== Personal life ==
Eyre married firstly Lucy Digby, daughter of Sir John Digby of Mansfield Woodhouse, Nottinghamshire on 9 June 1657. Before her death in June 1659, they had two children:

- Robert Eyre (1655–1660), who died young.
- Elizabeth Eyre.

He married secondly Elizabeth Pakington, daughter of Sir John Pakington, 2nd Baronet, of Westwood, Worcestershire. Together, they were the parents of three sons (two of whom predeceased him) and four daughters.

- Gervase Eyre (1669–1704), who married Catherine Cooke, the daughter and eventual heiress of Sir Henry Cooke, 2nd Baronet.
- Anthony Eyre (1671–1672), who died young.
- Dorothy Eyre, who married John Bradshaw Esq. in 1680.
- Margaret Eyre (b. 1667)

Eyre died in 1671 and was buried at Rampton on 11 November 1671. He was succeeded in his estates by his son Gervase Eyre.

== See also ==
- University of Nottingham Manuscripts and Special Collections Biography of Anthony Eyre (1634-1671)

Parliament of England
Preceded by Lord Houghton; Hon. William Pierrepont	Member of Parliament for Nottinghamshire; 1661–1671; With: Sir Gervase Clifton, Bt; Sir Francis Leke	Succeeded by Sir Scrope Howe; Sir Francis Leke
