= Grove Hall =

English country house

Coordinates: 53.309°N 0.893°W

Grove Hall was an extended Tudor country house located between Retford and Grove in Nottinghamshire, England, and was part of an extensive estate.

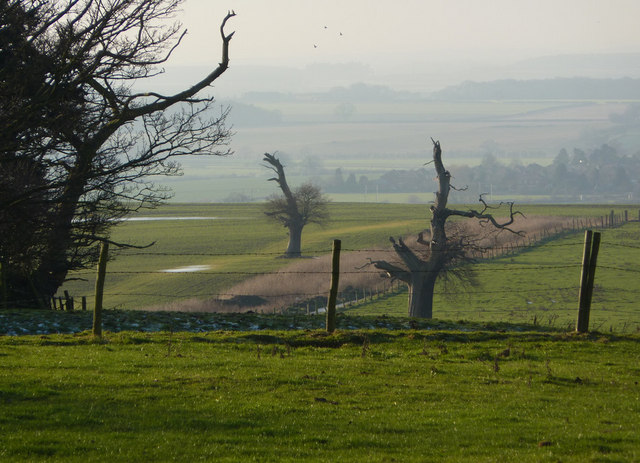
A view towards Grove Park

== History ==
The barony of Grove, with the manor of West Retford, was part of the large property granted by William the Conqueror to Roger de Busli. It was noted in Doomsday survey as "Grave". From Roger de Busli it came to Gerbert (or Gilbert) de Arches, Baron de Grove, in the early part of the reign of Henry II. Gilbert's great granddaughter, Theophania, being a co-heiress, carried it to Malvesinus de Hercy in the reign of Henry III.

The Hercy family built the original wing of Grove Hall. The estate continued in the Hercy family till Sir John de Hercy died in 1570 with no children but with eight sisters. Grove Hall was bequeathed to one of the sisters, Barbara, who had married George Nevile of Ragnall.

It descended in the Nevile family until the latter end of the seventeenth century, when Sir Edward Nevile sold it to Sir Creswell Levinz, one of the Judges of the Common Pleas.

Sir Creswell Levinz was succeeded by his son, William Levinz, who resided at Grove and was High Sheriff of Nottinghamshire for 1707–08 and sometime MP for East Retford and afterwards for Nottinghamshire. This William Levinz left a son, William, who alienated the greatest part of his inheritance and in 1762 sold the manor and estate of Grove, with its appurtenances, to Anthony Eyre of Rampton and Adwick-le-Street.

Anthony Eyre's son, Anthony Hardolph Eyre, died in 1836 leaving two daughters, one of which, Frances, inherited Grove. She had married Granville Harcourt Vernon, son of the Archbishop of York. The property passed down in the Harcourt-Vernon family to Granville Charles FitzHerbert Harcourt-Vernon, who sold the house in 1946.

The buyer was a Canon R.F. Wilkinson, who quickly sold it again, it was then used by the Ministry of Health for a short period, before being demolished by 1952. The site of the hall itself now contains a number of steel and concrete agricultural buildings (as part of a poultry farm) of little historic or architectural significance.

Remaining features of note throughout the estate include:

- The Old Rectory (listed at Grade II)
- Almshouses (Grade II)
- A range of earthworks of unknown origin date, but may include some pre-historic and/or Roman influences, with strong evidence of medieval (a moated site or possibly a motte & bailey) and Civil War defences.
- An outer belt of trees with a path around much of park's perimeter.
- Various outbuildings including stables (some converted into residences) and coach houses, Home Farm and formal rectangular kitchen garden with remains of glasshouses (later re-used as garden centre)
- Large wooded plantations and specimen trees, including a Araucaria (monkey-puzzle) tree
- Yew tree avenue
- Deer leap/park pale
- Fish ponds

== The Hall ==
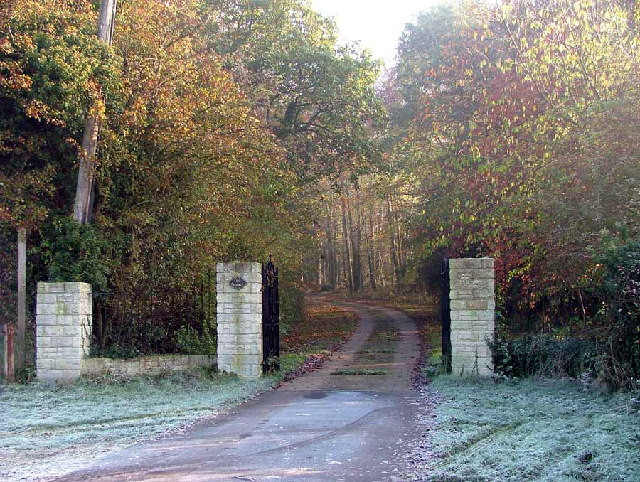
The new entrance to Grove Park

A large brick house in the Old English style, with gable ends and mullion windows, had been erected at Grove at a period which is not known, and had since undergone considerable alterations. During the wars between the Houses of York and Lancaster, the Hercy family, with their neighbours the Stanhopes, of Rampton, were active supporters of the House of Lancaster, and during the arduous struggle for superiority were frequently surrounded by dangers of no common kind; till at length Victory

"To Tudor's brow transfer'd the gem, The long disputed diadem."

Afterwards, as a mark of their zeal, and as a remembrance of their past services, they each of them inserted in the walls of their respective mansions, a sculptured rose and crown, the device assumed by Henry VII and by many of his adherents. At Grove this device was placed in the house over a large Gothic window which lights the principal staircase.

Sir Creswell Levinz and his son made some alterations in the house, as did Anthony Eyre after he purchased it, entirely altering the character of it. He removed the whole of the ancient roof and pulled down a considerable part of the south-west front, in the place of which, under the direction of architect John Carr, he built a suite of rooms of more convenient dimensions. In making this alteration, he took down a stone tower, which must have been built in the time of Queen Elizabeth I, under which were found a considerable number of the coins of that Queen's reign.

The lordship of Grove was extensive, containing about 1,500 acres (6.1 km^{2}), part of which is covered with wood, and the rest is occupied, either in grazing, or to agricultural purposes.

The situation of Grove Hall, is said to be the most elevated and picturesque in the Nottinghamshire; on all sides, the views are pleasing and extensive: to the east the levels of Lincolnshire appear "beautifully tinted with variety, the view of which, is backed with the noble promontory on which part of the city of Lincoln stands, whilst the minster rears its venerable head, and overlooks the vast Plains which extend themselves until the ocean terminates their bounds". To the west the view is equally extensive, the ancient forest of Sherwood, "from the numerous woods and plantations which rear their heads in every direction, reminds the beholder of ancient days, when the famous oaks displayed their towering boughs; this very interesting view is only terminated by the hills of Kinderskout in Derbyshire".
