= Roger Mynors (MP) =

16th-century English politician

Sir Roger Mynors (by 1478 – will proved 1537) was an English politician.

== Biography ==
He was the eldest son of Richard Mynors of Treago, Herefordshire. He succeeded his father in 1528 and was knighted in 1527.

He served as a justice of the peace for Derbyshire from 1502 to his death and for Herefordshire from 1528 to 1532. He was a Gentleman Usher by 1509. He was appointed High Sheriff of Nottinghamshire, Derbyshire and the Royal Forests for 1513–14.

He was elected a member (MP) of the Parliament of England for Derbyshire in 1529.

He died in 1537 and was buried at Duffield. He had married Alice, the daughter of Sir William Mill of Harescombe, Gloucestershire and widow of Nicholas Kniveton of Mercaston, Derbyshire. He had no children and his estate passed to his brother Thomas.
