= Brian de Lisle =

English soldier

Brian de Lisle (de L'Isle, de Insula) (died 1234) was an English soldier. By April 1200 Lisle was in the service of King John. In 1204 King John confiscated Gilbert de Mynors's property, including the manors of Barton and Girton in Cambridgeshire and put them in Lisle's custody. De Lisle died in 1234; his year of birth is unknown.
