= Grove, Nottinghamshire =

Village and civil parish in Nottinghamshire, England

Coordinates: 53.309°N 0.893°W

Grove
- Village and civil parish
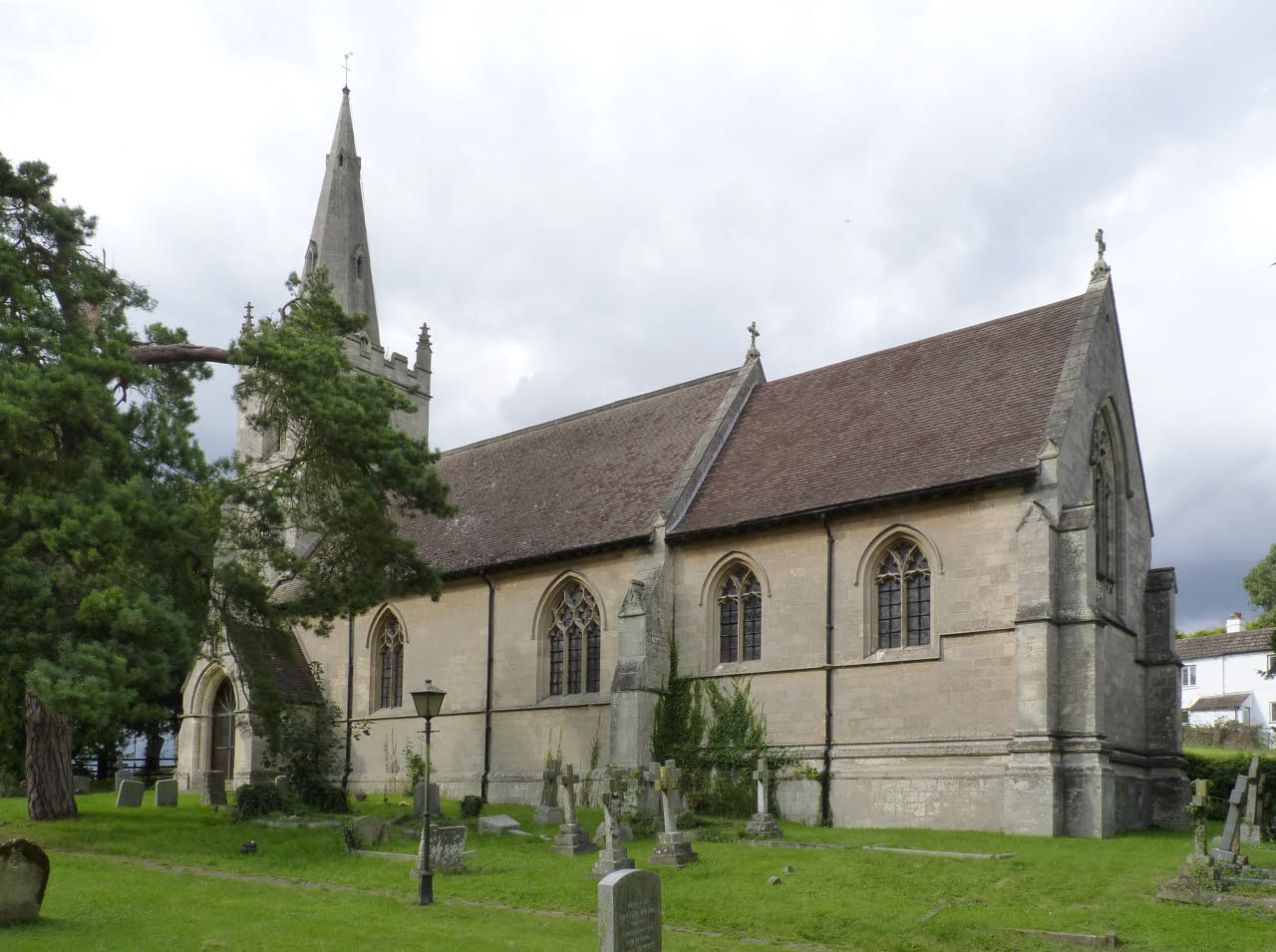
- Church of St Helen

- Location within Nottinghamshire
- Interactive map of Grove
- Area: 2.06 sq mi (5.3 km^{2})
- Population: 127 (2021)
  - Density: 62/sq mi (24/km^{2})
- OS grid reference: SK 739796
  - London: 130 mi (210 km) SE
- District: Bassetlaw
- Shire county: Nottinghamshire
- Region: East Midlands
- Country: England
- Sovereign state: United Kingdom
- Post town: RETFORD
- Postcode district: DN22
- Dialling code: 01777
- Police: Nottinghamshire
- Fire: Nottinghamshire
- Ambulance: East Midlands
- UK Parliament: Newark
- Website: hugsparishcouncil.co.uk

Grove is a small village and civil parish, located about 2 miles (3.2 km) south-east of Retford, Nottinghamshire. The population of the civil parish as of the 2011 census is 105, increasing to 127 in 2021. The parklands of Grove Hall separate it from Retford town, and a set of gates for Grove Hall can be found near the London Road, the A638.

The village itself is pleasant with wide verges along parts of the main road. The village once contained a garden centre, now built on, housed in the former kitchen gardens, of the Hall and there is also a very fine parish church.

== History ==
The barony of Grove, with the manor of West Retford was part of the large property granted by William the Conqueror to Roger de Busli and is thus noted in Domesday survey, as "Grave".

From Roger de Busli it came to Gerbert (or Gilbert) de Arches, Baron de Grove, in the early part of the reign of Henry II. Gilbrt's great granddaughter, Theophania, being a co-heiress, carried it to Malvesinus de Hercy, in the reign of Henry III. It continued in the Hercy family till Sir John de Hercy bequeathed it to Barbara, one of his sisters, and co-heiress, who had married George Nevile of Ragnall, in whose family it continued till the latter end of the seventeenth century, when Sir Edward Nevile sold it to Sir Creswell Levinz, one of the Judges of the Common Pleas.

Sir Creswell Levinz was succeeded by his son, William Levinz, who resided at Grove and was MP for East Retford and afterwards for Nottinghamshire. This William Levinz left a son, William, who alienated the greatest part of his inheritance and sold the manor and estate of Grove, with its appurtenances in the year 1762, to Anthony Eyre of Rampton and Adwick.

The papers of the Eyre family of Grove are at the department of Manuscripts and Special Collections, The University of Nottingham.

Grove Hall, a large brick house in the old English style, with gable ends and mullion windows, had been erected at Grove, at a period which is not known, and had undergone considerable alterations.

During the wars between the Houses of York and Lancaster, the Hercy family, with their neighbours the Stanhopes, of Rampton, were active supporters of the House of Lancaster, and during the arduous struggle for superiority, were frequently surrounded by dangers of no common kind; till at length Victory

"To Tudor's brow transferred the gem, The long disputed diadem."

== Parish church ==
See St. Helen's Church, Grove

== Castle Hill Wood ==
"All hail! ye mighty venerable work.

Of our forefathers great in deeds of arms!
To late posterity memorial stand

Of their immortal fame."

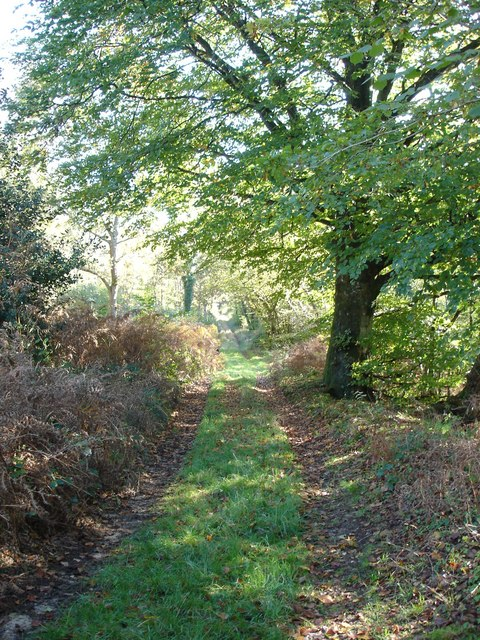
A track in Castle Hill Wood

Within the precincts of the parish, is a wood generally designated "Castle Hill Wood" where, as its name suggests, has formerly stood a castle on a mount (or Mote), which appears to have been surrounded by a double trench of considerable magnitude, having the entrance to the south-east. To the south-east of this mount is a piece of ground, now almost level, where the traces of foundations are discernible; this is surrounded by a moat both wide and deep having formerly circumscribed a mansion or castle, but of which no definite remains are now in existence. This place, as well as the one just alluded to, together with the greatest part of an extensive wood, are still circumvallated, and a trench or foss, in some instances double, may be distinctly traced for upwards of a mile.

It is generally acknowledged that this part of the country formed a portion of the settlements of the Coritani, but that in common with the rest of Great Britain, it became a prey to the Roman armies, who, in making the conquest, were necessitated to undergo considerable hardships and privations, and on obtaining possession, to cast up those fortresses and bulwarks, which, in almost every part of the United Kingdom, remain to the present time, as mementos of their bravery and determined perseverance.

It is believed it "may be properly attributed the formation of these extensive works, although others have supposed them to have been originally British". But opinion with respects to this site, are "other circumstances concurring with the above, tending to confirm the supposition of their being of Roman origin". About a mile beyond Little Gringley are the traces of an encampment to the right of the road leading to Leverton; "which road has every appearance of having been Roman, and was continued to North Leverton onward to the Roman station at Littleborough, without fetching the compass towards South Leverton, which it now does; and the old road may still be traced, being, with the intervention of a wood, nearly entire".

The situation is particularly noted in some of the oldest maps of Nottinghamshire, under the appellation of 'Little Gringley Castle."

"This place has occupied the attention of antiquarians for a long period, in attempting to fix upon it as the Segelocum, mentioned in the Itenerary of Antoninus. Camden, in his first edition of the Britannia, had fixed this station at Eaton, but afterwards, it is said, he changed his opinion in favour of Littleborough. Mr. Horsley, also decidedly says "Segelocum or Agelocum, as called in two iters, is certainly Littleborough. Dr. Gale was of the same opinion; and Pegge, in his British Topography, seems to coincide therewith. To such an host of observations and conjectures, I cannot presume to add any thing, save that of recording an humble opinion in favour of that given by Mr. Horsley.

In 1684, when the inclosures between the bridge and town were first ploughed up, many coins of Nerva, Trajan, Hadrian, Constantine, &c. were found, together with intaglios of agate, and cornelian, the finest coloured urns, and paterae, some wrought in basso relievo, with the workman's name generally impressed on the inside of the bottom; also a discus, or quoit, with an emperor's head embossed upon it. Again, in 1718, two very handsomely moulded altars were dug up, and in 1759, the drawing of another was communicated to the Society of Antiquaries. A curious tassera, or tally, was also found near this place; these tallies were supposed to have been used in the Roman armies, to distinguish each other from the enemy, and for setting the nightly watch."

On this road, between Leverton and Littleborough, formerly existed a stone bridge, about the repairs of which, several disputes arose. In 1253, the court of Oswardbeck was held at Sturton, when an inquisition was taken, as to whether the inhabitants of Sturton and Fenton, or the abbot of Welbeck should repair it; the jurors gave it in favour of the abbot.

== See also ==
- Listed buildings in Grove, Nottinghamshire
