= Rampton =

Rampton may refer to:

== People ==
- Ben Rampton (born 1953), British linguist
- Cal Rampton (1913–2007), U.S. politician
- George Rampton (1888–1971), English footballer
- Richard Rampton (born 1941), British lawyer
- Sheldon Rampton (born 1957), U.S. political writer
- Lucybeth Rampton (1914–2004)
- Tony Rampton (basketball) (born 1976), former New Zealand professional basketball player.
- Tony Rampton (businessman) (1915–1993), chairman of Freemans and philanthropist

== Places ==
- Rampton, Cambridgeshire
- Rampton, Nottinghamshire
  - Rampton Secure Hospital
  - Rampton and Woodbeck, a parish formerly called just "Rampton"

== Music ==
- Rampton (album), 2002 album by English drone doom supergroup Teeth of Lions Rule the Divine
