= Nether Headon =

Hamlet in Nottinghamshire, England

Coordinates: 53.291°N 0.880°W

- Hamlet
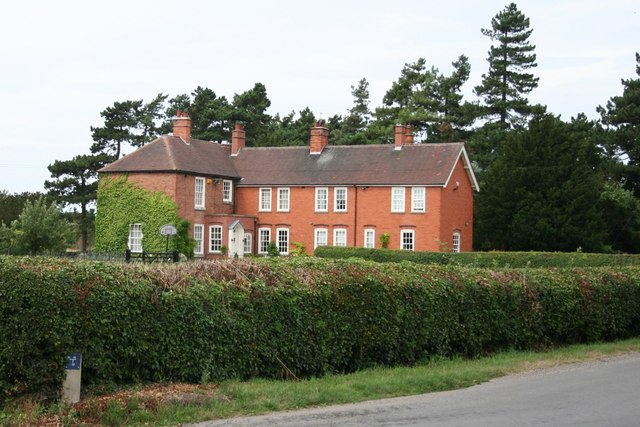
- Headon Manor Farm

- Location within Nottinghamshire
- Population: 253 (2011 Census) with Headon, Upton and Stokeham
- OS grid reference: SK 74802 77743
- Civil parish: Headon cum Upton
- District: Bassetlaw
- Shire county: Nottinghamshire
- Region: East Midlands
- Country: England
- Sovereign state: United Kingdom
- Post town: Retford
- Postcode district: DN22
- Dialling code: 01777
- UK Parliament: Newark

Map

Nether Headon is a hamlet in Headon cum Upton civil parish, within the Bassetlaw district, of the county of Nottinghamshire, England. It is 3.5 miles south east of the nearest market town Retford, 26 miles north east of the county town Nottingham and 125 miles north of London. The hamlet is adjacent to the villages of Upton, Headon, East Drayton, Eaton, Grove, Woodbeck and Stokeham. In 2011 the parish, together with Stokeham had a population of 253.

== Toponymy ==
Headon was known as Hedun in the Domesday Book and is possibly derived from the Old English for high hill.

Nether Headon means 'under Headon'.

== Geography ==
=== Location ===
Nether Headon lies in the centre portion of the Nottinghamshire county and southern area of Bassetlaw district.

It is surrounded by the following local areas:

- Grove to the north
- Headon village and Upton to the south
- East Drayton, Woodbeck, Stokeham and Treswell to the east
- Eaton, Gamston and Retford to the west.

=== Settlements ===
==== Nether Headon ====
This is 1/3 mile (0.5 km) to the north of Headon village. Primarily residential but sparsely so, with agricultural surroundings, it is a linear settlement aligned along Greenspotts Lane.

==== Ladywell Rise & Headon Camp ====
This is a former World War II era prisoner of war (PoW) camp which afterwards was converted into a primarily industrial area with some residential plots, located north of Lady Well Lane. It is considered a distant portion of Nether Headon. and includes a small number of tenanted residential housing fronting the road, with industrial properties mainly further inset of the site.

=== Landscape ===
The parish is low-lying. The land height is lowest in the south east corner of the parish, at around 20 metres (66 ft). The highest points are Lodge Field Clump and Mill Hill both at 70 metres (230 ft) in the north and east of the parish respectively, these providing clear views of the Trent Valley and the wider region. Nether Headon lies at the base of a ridge and stays around the 30–35 metres (98–115 ft) range, before rising towards Ladywell Rise, and the church and village hall in Headon.

== Governance and demographics ==
Nether Headon, Ladywell Rise and Headon Camp, although discrete settlements, are combined with Headon village and Upton to form Headon cum Upton parish for administrative identity.

For population purposes the parish is reported alongside Stokeham parish with a total of 253 residents.

These are managed at the first level of public administration by the combined Headon, Grove & Stokeham Parish Council, for wider area neighbourhood purposes it is abbreviated to HUGS.

At district level, this is managed by Bassetlaw District Council.

Nottinghamshire County Council governs the wider area, managing the highest level of local services.

== History ==
Local fields have unearthed flint tools, showing the area was settled in for at least 5000 years or more. Several Roman pottery pieces excavated prove there were people living in the locality during Roman times. With Viking invasions the hamlet of Thorpe was eventually formed, and there was some proof that Saxons and Danes were living alongside each other, with Danish words naming local fields such as the Wong and Gooseholm. The other two villages of "up town" (Upton) and Nether Headon eventually were formed from population expansion.

Headon was recorded in the Domesday Book, being relatively notable due to six thegns or nobles being noted, each of whom had a hall. Domesday also lists that Headon had a sizeable population. This is shown by the size of the Church of St Peter, which was much larger in medieval times. The church was first reported as being in the village by 1171. An Anglo-Saxon burial mound exists in Gamston wood near the parish boundary, with another possibly at Lodge Field Clump.

There is a possible association to Robin Hood. Present day Manor Farm is probably the site of the original village manor, and remains of a moat are near this. Simon de Headon owned the manor in the 13th century and his son Gerard both became sheriffs of Nottinghamshire (in 1259, 1267 and 1269) so one of them may have been a rival of Robin Hood's. A tomb cover depicting a knight in chain mail armour was found outside Headon church during the 1980s. It dates from c.1275, and likely belonged to one of the de Headons.

The Dumblehole is part of the footpath leading from Nether Headon to Grove. Remains of fish ponds which belonged to the de Headons can still be seen alongside the Dumblehole. Mill Hill Clump was once the site of a windmill. In 1710 Sir Hardolph Wasteneys built Headon Hall within the grounds of Headon Park, which was designed by Sir Thomas Hewitt. In 1792, the heir of the lordship, and son of local MP Gervase Eyre, Anthony Hardolph Eyre, demolished the Hall. He founded a school near the site which later on became the East West Cottage. During his time oak and ash tree plantations were established and hop yards and gypsum quarries provided employment for locals, by which time in 1798 numbered 286.

With a well head, archway and trough, and constructed in red brick and ashlar Lady Well is said to be of medieval origin, though its present outer materials dates from the 18th and 19th centuries with a keystone inscribed date of 1718. South of this, a clay pit and brick yard also existed in Nether Headon, with the Brickyard Farm presently on the upper edge of the site.

In 1818 some 3000 acres of open field in Headon and Upton were enclosed by Act of Parliament, creating the present layout by the planting of thorn hedges, drainage ditches dug and closing off footpaths. The Harcourt Vernons were successors to the Eyres, and the family built a new school for the village around the start of the 20th century. The school also functioned as a community centre from the beginning. The Grove Estate was sold by auction in 1946, and Headon village bought the school, via local subscriptions.

=== Nether Headon PoW Camp ===
Prior to the 1940s, the area north of Lady Well remained as undeveloped agricultural land. In 1940–1944 the camp was constructed during WWII to hold prisoners of war. It was alternatively known as PoW Camp 52. The camp was one of only a small number of this type in Nottinghamshire and the only such site in the district which is substantially intact (the other local sites were at Serlby Hall, Carlton Hall at Carlton-in-Lindrick, Norton and Carburton). Local records recorded German and Italian prisoners on site during the war and in the immediate period after. Although a number of the camp buildings on the site have been demolished, the overall layout and composition of the camp is still intact, including a water tower.

The main entrance was off Ladywell Lane, with a main access road heading northwards with small units either side (possibly workshops and other non-accommodation buildings). Towards the north end of the site were 3 rows of barracks, where the PoWs would have resided. Immediately south of this was a fourth row of buildings, which included shower blocks which have partially survived. Some of the service buildings such as the chapel (which according to local residents was a building at the western end of the site) have been demolished. To the east of the site is the large water tower, and outside of the prisoner part of the site to the east was the officers’ mess and administration buildings. Further buildings exist in the south west corner of the site, although their original function is unknown. The buildings towards the front appear to have been further administration buildings. The precise date that the camp was redeveloped as an industrial estate is unknown, however it is likely that this transformation was gradual, with former PoW buildings being progressively converted to industrial uses, with civil use recorded since the 1950–60s.

== Culture and community ==
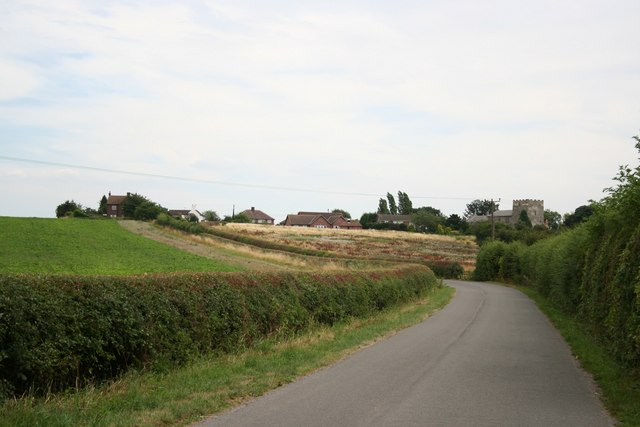
View of Headon village from Nether Headon

The Lady Well on Ladywell Lane has occasionally given a well dressing for Headon church fundraising events. It is a regional ritual which was carried out throughout 1981–1991 and more recently in celebration of the millennium.

== Religious sites ==
There is one church in the parish, at Headon village. It is on the western edge of the village, towards Nether Headon. This Church of England parish church is dedicated to St Peter.

== Economy ==
The Headon Camp Industrial Estate at Ladywell Rise on Lady Well Lane offers small operating premises for local businesses.

== Landmarks ==
The Headon Camp Industrial Estate has old buildings of interest to military history.

=== Listed structures ===
Several buildings and structures throughout the parish are listed as features of historical interest, only one exists in the Nether Headon vicinity:

- The Lady Well head on Ladywell Lane (Grade II).
