= Rampton and Woodbeck =

Civil parish in Nottinghamshire, England

Coordinates: 53.294°N 0.823°W

- Civil parish
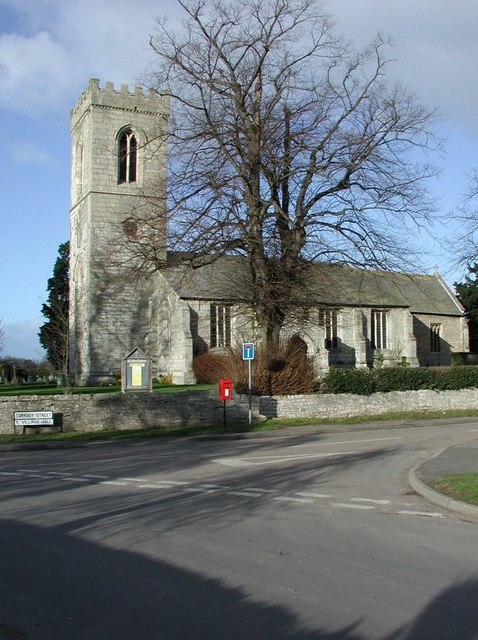
- All Saints' parish church, Rampton

- Location within Nottinghamshire
- Interactive map of Rampton and Woodbeck
- Area: 3.38 sq mi (8.8 km^{2})
- Population: 1,077 (2021)
  - Density: 319/sq mi (123/km^{2})
- OS grid reference: SK 785781
  - London: 125 mi (201 km) S
- District: Bassetlaw
- Shire county: Nottinghamshire
- Region: East Midlands
- Country: England
- Sovereign state: United Kingdom
- Settlements: Rampton and Woodbeck
- Post town: RETFORD
- Postcode district: DN22
- Dialling code: 01777
- Police: Nottinghamshire
- Fire: Nottinghamshire
- Ambulance: East Midlands
- UK Parliament: Newark
- Website: www.ramptonandwoodbeck-pc.gov.uk

Rampton and Woodbeck is a civil parish in the Bassetlaw district, within the county of Nottinghamshire, England. The overall area had a population of 1,077 at the 2021 census. The parish lies in the north east of the county. It is 125 miles north west of London, 27 miles north east of the city of Nottingham, and 5 miles south east of the town of Retford. The parish rests alongside the county border with Lincolnshire. It is the site of Rampton Secure Hospital, which is one of only three high security psychiatric hospitals in England.

== Geography ==
=== Location ===
The parish lies along the north east boundary of the Nottinghamshire county and the Lincolnshire border.

It is surrounded by the following local areas:

- Treswell to the north
- Fenton, Kettlethorpe, Laneham and Stokeham to the south
- Torksey to the east
- Headon and Upton to the west.

Rampton and Woodbeck is a wide but flat parish measuring 4.30 miles (6.92 km) by 1.50 miles (2.41 km).

=== Settlements ===
The parish consists of two settlements:

- Rampton
- Woodbeck

==== Rampton ====
This is the historic village in the area. It is located in the middle of the parish. Some amenities are available in the village, such as a church, public house and a post office.

Although the secure hospital is named after the village, it is over 1.5 miles away in Woodbeck.

==== Woodbeck ====
The village is largely taken up by the Rampton Hospital grounds, and ex-staff housing. There are some farm houses and cottages on the fringes of the location but there is very little by way of public facilities.

=== Landscape ===
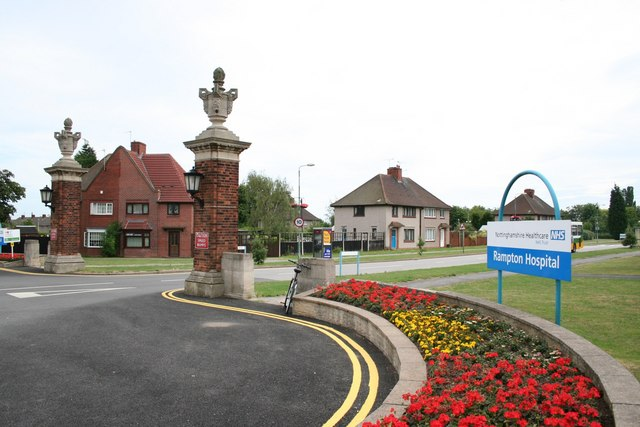
Entrance to Rampton Hospital at Woodbeck

Predominantly, many of the parish residents are clustered around the villages. Outside of these is a scattering of farms, farmhouses and cottages amongst a wider rural setting. Very little wooded areas exist. The former Cottam Power Station core buildings and structures are not in the parish, these are however visible from the villages, its adjacent substation array and remnants of its coal stockpile and cooling towers are within the boundary. Torksey Viaduct spanning the River Trent is located in the far right corner of the area, and has been converted into a footpath to Torksey.

==== Water features ====
- The River Trent is the parish east border.
- The North Beck stream forms the west edge of the area.

==== Land elevation ====
The parish is relatively low-lying. The land height is a maximum of 10 metres (33 ft) between Rampton and the River Trent. From there it rises to a high of 45 metres (148 ft) west of Woodbeck.

== Governance and demography ==
The overall area had a population of 1,077 at the 2021 census, a reduction from the 1,139 of the 2011 census.

Although discrete settlements, these are managed at the first level of public administration by Rampton and Woodbeck Parish Council.

At district level, the wider area is managed by Bassetlaw District Council, and by Nottinghamshire County Council at its highest tier.

== History ==
=== Toponymy ===
The toponym "Rampton" is possibly derived from Old English Ramm-tūn, meaning "farmstead where rams are kept". Woodbeck was named after the farm that was in the location originally, which was located between a 'wood and a beck', the remains of a small forested area lies to the east and a beck runs alongside the area. The parish was singularly named Rampton until April 2018.

=== Rampton ===
Rampton had an important manor in Norman times. Rampton Hall of the Stanhope and Babington families was built in the reign of Henry VIII and pulled down in 1720. The open fields and commons which comprised nearly half the parish was enclosed in 1843. There was a Wesleyan Methodist chapel in the village built in 1857. On the eastern edge of All Saints' churchyard is a mid-16th-century Tudor gateway which once led to Rampton Manor, and was the former home of the Eyre family. It is brick with terracotta panels and is a listed building ornamented with the armorial bearings of the Stanhope, Babington, and Eyre families. The Eyre manor was demolished in the 20th century.

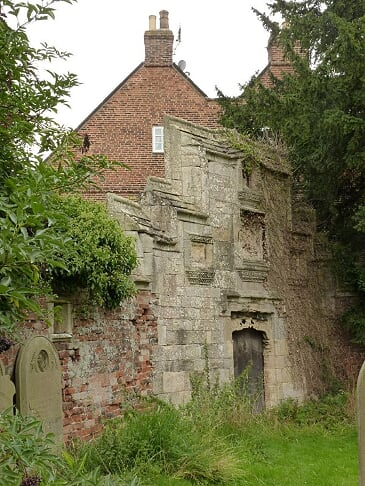
The surviving gate to the site of the demolished Rampton Manor.

The Great Central Railway skirted the upper edge of the parish via the Leverton Branch which linked Sheffield and Lincolnshire. The former railway viaduct across the Trent into Lincolnshire was refurbished as a public footpath in 2017. The closest railway station used to be at Cottam which operated between 1850 and 1959.

The village hall had opened in the 1840s as the first Village School, after the opening of Rampton Hospital in 1912 the school needed to expand and relocate with the building of Woodbeck. The former school room became the village hall, the parish council purchasing this in 1995.

=== Woodbeck ===
Prior to development, the area was primarily farmland. Woodbeck was named after the local farm which was bought by the Minister of Prisons in 1907. The farmhouse was sold to the Government when the area was chosen for the building of a high security psychiatric hospital. Initially known as Rampton Criminal Lunatic Asylum, building work was started in 1909. The hospital was originally conceived as an annex to Broadmoor with the aim of reducing overcrowding and opened in 1912. As hospital patient numbers increased in the 1920s, a programme of building staff houses was begun. The houses were originally allocated to married staff members with families; unmarried staff were housed in two residential blocks which later opened in 1931.

An increase in the number of staff saw an expansion of the staff club (previously the Woodbeck farmhouse) to include a cricket pavilion (1935) and other sports facilities. In the 1990s the residence blocks were converted into offices and are presently located within the outer perimeter fence of the hospital. The 1990s also saw the sale of many of the houses at Woodbeck to private ownership. The staff club, shop, post office, tennis courts, bowling green and cricket pavilion were demolished to make way for a new control room and entry building on completion of the new perimeter fence in 2003.

== Community ==
There is a village hall in nearby Rampton. There is a public house in Rampton, The Eyre Arms, named after a notable local family. Commercial ventures in the village include a vehicle service centre. There is a recreation park to the south of the village.

There is a car repair workshop in Woodbeck as well as a small café. A small playground is in the village.

== Education ==
Rampton Primary School is to the west of Rampton village, and offers nursery facilities.

== Religious sites ==
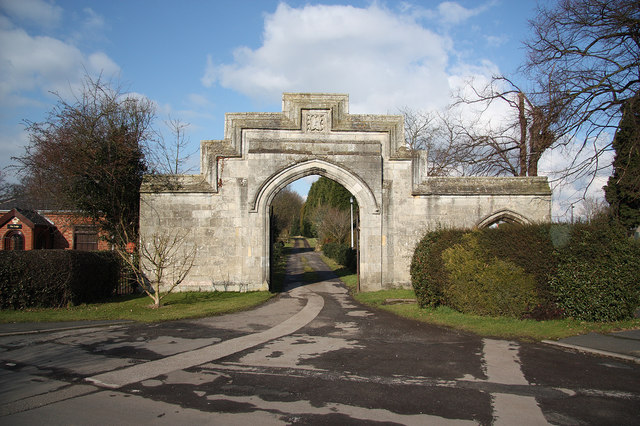
Neo-Tudor 19th century gateway to the drive that leads to the Manor House

There is one church in Rampton village. The Church of England parish church of All Saints has 10th-century Anglo-Saxon features. There is a cemetery to the north of the village.

== Landmarks ==
The long distance Trent Valley Way walking path passes through the parish and follows the River Trent.

=== Listed buildings and locations ===
Several buildings and structures throughout the parish are listed as features of historical interest primarily around Rampton, notably:

- All Saints Church (Grade I)
- Torksey Viaduct (Grade II*)

An ancient moated site to the east of Rampton is registered as a scheduled monument.
