= Listed buildings in Headon cum Upton =

Headon cum Upton is a civil parish in the Bassetlaw District of Nottinghamshire, England. The parish contains six listed buildings that are recorded in the National Heritage List for England. Of these, one is listed at Grade I, the highest of the three grades, and the others are at Grade II, the lowest grade. The parish contains the settlements of Headon, Upton and Nether Headon, and the surrounding countryside. The listed buildings consist of two cottages, two farmhouses, a church and a well.

== Key ==
Grade	Criteria
I	Buildings of exceptional interest, sometimes considered to be internationally important
II	Buildings of national importance and special interest

== Buildings ==
Name and location	Photograph	Date	Notes	Grade
St Peter's Church; 53.28533°N 0.87868°W		13th century	The church has been altered and extended through the centuries, and it was restored in 1855. It is built in stone with slate roofs, and consists of a nave with a clerestory, north and south aisles, a south porch, a chancel, a north vestry and a west tower. The tower has two stages, a plinth, angle buttresses, bands, and an embattled parapet. On the west side is a three-light window with a hood mould, above which is a lancet window, and on the north and south sides are blocked arches.	I
Small Holme Farmhouse; 53.27910°N 0.88380°W		Late 16th century	The farmhouse has a timber framed core and is enclosed in brick. It has a rendered plinth and a pantile roof, hipped on the left. There are two storeys, five bays, and a continuous rear outshut. On the front are two doorways, one blocked with a segmental arch, and the windows are horizontally-sliding sashes, two with segmental arches.	II
Glebe Farmhouse; 53.28400°N 0.87857°W		17th century	The farmhouse is timber framed with brick nogging, and has a hipped pantile roof. There are two storeys and five bays, and to the right is a brick lean-to. On the front are two doorways and horizontally-sliding sash windows, some with cambered arches.	II
The Lady Well; 53.29324°N 0.87867°W	—	18th century	The well head is over a spring and set into a bank side. Over it is a round arch in brick with a re-used dated and initialled stone keystone. Along the base is a stone sill, and there is a single projecting stone trough.	II
Vernon House; 53.27764°N 0.88065°W		Mid 18th century	The cottage, at one time a public house, is in brick on a plinth, with an eaves band and a pantile roof. There are two storeys, five bays, the right bay later and higher, and a rear lean-to extension. On the front is a doorway with a fanlight, and the windows are horizontally-sliding sashes with segmental heads.	II
Rose Cottage; 53.27790°N 0.88125°W		Early 19th century	The cottage is in red brick with some rendering, and has an eaves band, dentilled eaves and a pantile roof. There are two storeys and an attic, a front range of three bays, and a two-storey rear wing. The central doorway has a hood, the windows are sashes, and all the openings have flush wedge lintels.	II
