= St Peter's Church, Headon-cum-Upton =

Coordinates: 53°17′08″N 00°52′44″W

St. Peter's Church, Headon-cum-Upton
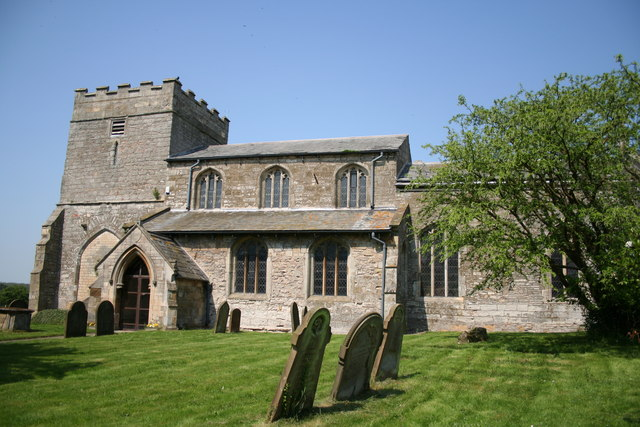
- St. Peter's Church, Headon-cum-Upton
- Denomination: Church of England
- Churchmanship: Broad Church

History
- Dedication: St. Peter

Administration
- Province: York
- Diocese: Southwell and Nottingham
- Deanery: Bassetlaw & Bawtry
- Parish: Headon cum Upton

Clergy
- Vicar: Rev J Jesson

St. Peter's Church, Headon-cum-Upton is a parish church in the Church of England in Headon, Nottinghamshire.

The church is Grade I listed by the Department for Digital, Culture, Media and Sport as a building of outstanding architectural or historic interest.

== History ==
The church is medieval dating from the twelfth century, but much dates from the fourteenth century.

== Stained glass ==
There are no stained glass windows

== Parish structure ==
The church is in a group of parishes which includes

- St. Nicholas' Church, Askham
- St. Helen's Church, Grove
- Church of St. John the Baptist, East Markham
- St. Peter's Church, Headon-cum-Upton

== See also ==
- Grade I listed buildings in Nottinghamshire
- Listed buildings in Headon cum Upton
