= Headon cum Upton =

Coordinates: 53.284°N 0.877°W

- Civil parish
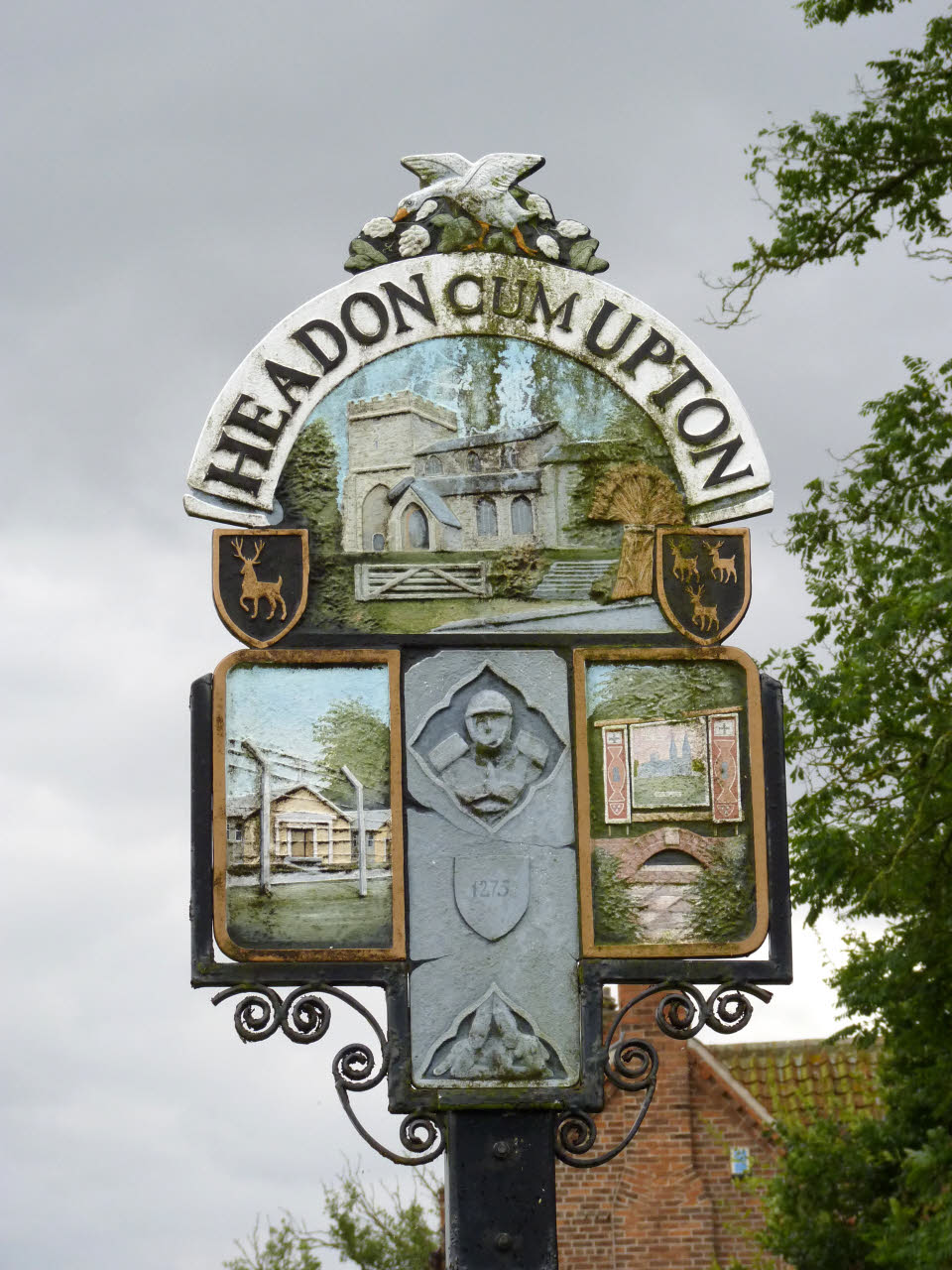
- Village sign

- Location within Nottinghamshire
- Interactive map of Headon cum Upton
- Area: 3.66 sq mi (9.5 km^{2})
- Population: 192 (2021 Census)
  - Density: 52/sq mi (20/km^{2})
- OS grid reference: SK 74900 76985
  - London: 125 mi (201 km) SE
- District: Bassetlaw
- Shire county: Nottinghamshire
- Region: East Midlands
- Country: England
- Sovereign state: United Kingdom
- Settlements: Headon; Upton; Nether Headon
- Post town: RETFORD
- Postcode district: DN22
- Dialling code: 01777
- UK Parliament: Newark
- Website: hugsparishcouncil.co.uk

Headon cum Upton is a civil parish in the Bassetlaw district, in the county of Nottinghamshire, England. The parish includes the villages of Headon, Upton and the hamlet of Nether Headon. The parish is adjacent to Askham, Gamston, East Drayton, Eaton, Grove, Rampton and Woodbeck, Stokeham and Treswell. In the 2021 census, the parish had a population of 192. The area is 3.5 miles south east of the nearest market town Retford, 26 miles north east of the county town Nottingham and 125 miles north of London. Headon cum Upton shares a parish council with Grove and Stokeham. There are 6 listed buildings in Headon cum Upton.

== Toponymy ==
Headon was known as Hedun in the Domesday Book and is possibly derived from the Old English for high hill.

Upton was also in Domesday as Upetun, and may have referred to an 'Up Farm' or 'Up town'.

Nether Headon means 'under Headon'.

== Geography ==
=== Location ===
The parish lies in the north east portion of the Nottinghamshire county and southern area of Bassetlaw district. It is one of the larger parishes in Bassetlaw, with almost 3000 acres.

It is surrounded by the following local areas:

- Grove to the north
- Askham to the south
- East Drayton, Rampton and Woodbeck, Stokeham and Treswell to the east
- Eaton, Gamston and Retford to the west.

=== Settlements ===
The parish consists of three settlements and a mixed use area:

==== Headon ====
This is the historic village in the area. Primarily residential with several farms, it is located in the southern centre of the parish, and clustered around three roads - Yew Tree Road and Thorpe Street, with the community amenities of a church and village hall on Church Street.

==== Upton ====
The hamlet is a linear settlement in the very south of the parish, ¾ km (0.46 mi) south of Headon. It is predominantly laid out along Main Street for ½ km (0.31 mi). The area is mainly a mix of residential, farm houses and agricultural buildings. There are some farm houses and cottages on the fringes of the location but there is very little by way of public facilities.

==== Nether Headon ====
This hamlet is ½ km (0.31 mi) to the north of Headon. Primarily residential and agricultural, it is a linear settlement aligned to Greenspotts Lane.

==== Ladywell Rise/Nether Headon Camp ====
This is a former World War II era prisoner of war camp which afterwards was converted into a primarily industrial area with some residential plots, located north of Lady Well Lane. It is considered a distant portion of Nether Headon. and includes a number of tenanted residential housing fronting the road, with industrial properties mainly further inset of the site.

=== Landscape ===
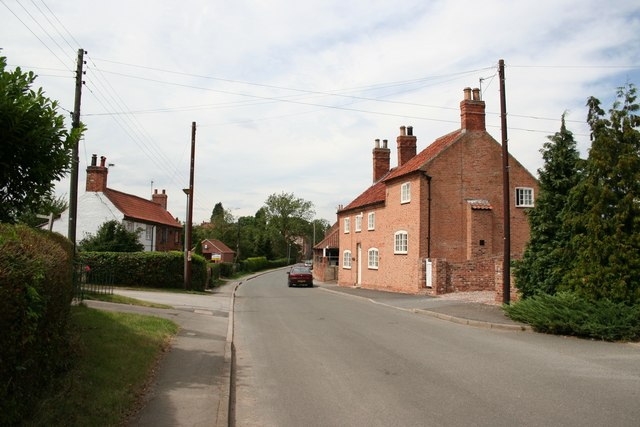
Upton

Predominantly, many of the parish residents are clustered around the villages. Outside of these is a scattering of farms, farmhouses and cottages amongst a wider rural setting. Some small wooded areas exist, mainly to the north of the villages.

The parish is low-lying. The land height is lowest in the south east corner of the parish, at around 20 metres (66 ft). The highest points are Lodge Field Clump and Mill Hill both at 70 metres (230 ft) in the north and east of the parish respectively, these providing clear views of the Trent Valley and the wider region. The villages all lay within the 30–35 metres (98–115 ft) range, with the church and village hall on a small peak within Headon.

The North Beck stream forms much of the north eastern edge of the parish.

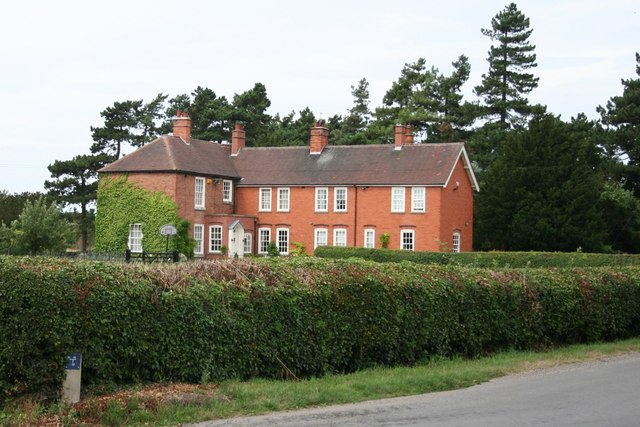
Headon Manor, at Nether Headon

== Governance and demographics ==
Headon, Upton and Nether Headon/Ladywell Rise form discrete settlements.

However, together these are within Headon cum Upton parish for administrative identity.

For population purposes the parish reports a total of 192 residents in the 2021 census.

It is managed at the first level of public administration by the combined Headon, Grove & Stokeham Parish Council, for wider area neighbourhood purposes it is abbreviated to HUGS.

At district level, this is managed by Bassetlaw District Council.

Nottinghamshire County Council governs the wider area, managing the highest level of local services.

== History ==
Local fields have unearthed flint tools, showing the area was settled in for at least 5000 years or more. Several Roman pottery pieces excavated prove there were people living in the locality during Roman times. With Viking invasions the hamlet of Thorpe was eventually formed, and there was some proof that Saxons and Danes were living alongside each other, with Danish words naming local fields such as the Wong and Gooseholm. The other two villages of "up town" (Upton) and Nether Headon eventually were formed from population expansion.

Headon was recorded in the Domesday Book, being relatively notable due to six thegns or nobles being noted, each of whom had a hall. Domesday also lists that Headon had a sizeable population. This is shown by the size of the Church of St Peter, which was much larger in medieval times. The church was first reported as being in the village by 1171. An Anglo-Saxon burial mound exists in Gamston wood near the parish boundary, with another possibly at Lodge Field Clump.

There is a possible association to Robin Hood. Present day Manor Farm is probably the site of the original village manor, and remains of a moat are near this. Simon de Headon owned the manor in the 13th century and his son Gerard both became sheriffs of Nottinghamshire (in 1259,1267 and 1269) so one of them may have been a rival of Robin Hood's. A tomb cover depicting a knight in chain mail armour was found outside Headon church during the 1980s. It dates from c.1275, and likely belonged to one of the de Headons.

The Dumblehole is part of the footpath leading from Nether Headon to Grove. Remains of fish ponds which belonged to the de Headons can still be seen alongside the Dumblehole. Mill Hill Clump was once the site of a windmill. In 1710 Sir Hardolph Wasteneys built Headon Hall within the grounds of Headon Park, which was designed by Sir Thomas Hewitt. In 1792, the heir of the lordship, and son of local MP Gervase Eyre, Anthony Hardolph Eyre, demolished the Hall. He founded a school near the site which later on became the East West Cottage. During his time oak and ash tree plantations were established and hop yards and gypsum quarries provided employment for locals, by which time in 1798 the population numbered 286.

With a well head, archway and trough, and constructed in red brick and ashlar Lady Well is said to be of medieval origin, though its present outer materials dates from the 18th and 19th centuries with a keystone inscribed date of 1718. South of this, a clay pit and brick yard also existed in Nether Headon, with the Brickyard Farm presently on the upper edge of the site.

In 1818 some 3000 acres of open field in Headon and Upton were enclosed by Act of Parliament, creating the present layout by planting thorn hedges, digging drainage ditches and closing off footpaths. The Harcourt Vernons were successors to the Eyres, and built a new school for the village around the start of the 20th century. The school also functioned as a community centre from the beginning. The Grove Estate was sold by auction in 1946, and Headon village bought the school, via local subscriptions.

Three council houses were built by 1958, allowing for the demolition of the Sparrow Barracks cottages. Two bungalows, intended for elderly residents was subsequently built in the cleared area.

=== Nether Headon PoW Camp ===
Prior to the 1940s, the area remained as undeveloped agricultural land. In 1940-1944 the camp was constructed during WWII to hold prisoners of war. It was alternatively known as POW Camp 52. The camp was one of only a small number of this type in Nottinghamshire and the only such site in the district which is substantially intact (the other local sites were at Serlby Hall, Carlton Hall at Carlton-in-Lindrick, Norton and Carburton). Local records recorded German and Italian prisoners on site during the war and in the immediate period after. Although a number of the camp buildings on the site have been demolished, the overall layout and composition of the camp is still intact, including a still intact water tower.

The main entrance was off Ladywell Lane, with a main access road heading northwards with small units either side (possibly workshops and other non-accommodation buildings). Towards the north end of the site were 3 rows of barracks, where the POWs would have resided. Immediately south of this was a fourth row of buildings, which included shower blocks which have partially survived. Some of the service buildings such as the chapel (which according to local residents was a building at the western end of the site) have been demolished. To the east of the site is a large water tower and outside of the prisoner part of the site, to the east was the officers’ mess and administration buildings. Further buildings exist in the south west corner of the site, although their original function is unknown. The buildings towards the front appear to have been further administration buildings. The precise date that the camp was redeveloped as an industrial estate is unknown, however it is likely that this transformation was gradual, with former POW buildings being progressively converted to industrial uses, with civil use recorded since the 1950-60s.

== Culture and community ==
There is a village hall in Headon. Originally the Headon National School built at the turn of the 20th century, it replaced the previous school on the site of Headon Hall, The school closed in 1959 and subsequently converted into the village hall.

The Lady Well on Ladywell Lane has occasionally given a well dressing for church fundraising events. It is a regional ritual which was carried out throughout 1981-1991 and more recently in celebration of the millennium.

== Religious sites ==
There is one church in the parish, at Headon village. The Church of England parish church dedicated to St Peter, although recorded as being in the village from earlier, has 13th-century Anglo-Saxon features.

== Economy ==
- The Headon Camp Industrial Estate at Ladywell Rise on Lady Well Lane offers small operating premises for local businesses.
- There is a microlight aircraft field and school in Headon.

== Landmarks ==
- The Headon Camp Industrial Estate has old buildings of interest to military history.

=== Listed structures ===
Several buildings and structures throughout the parish are listed as features of historical interest, notably:

- St. Peter's Church on Church Street (Grade I)
- The Lady Well head on Ladywell Lane (Grade II).
