= Woodbeck =

Village in Nottinghamshire, England

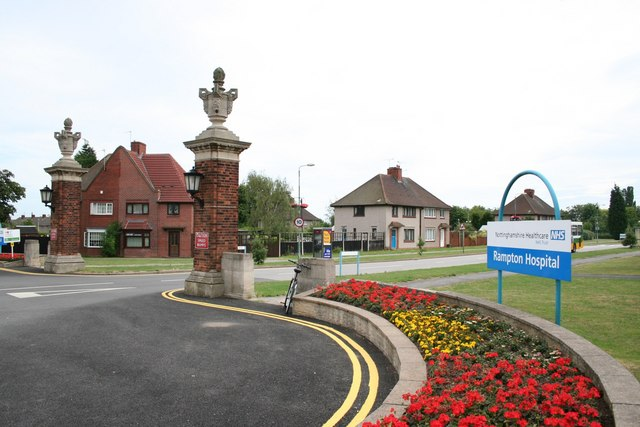
- Rampton Hospital entrance

- Location within Nottinghamshire
- Population: 1,077 (2021 Census)
- OS grid reference: SK 77627 78175
- Civil parish: Rampton and Woodbeck
- District: Bassetlaw
- Shire county: Nottinghamshire
- Region: East Midlands
- Country: England
- Sovereign state: United Kingdom
- Post town: Retford
- Postcode district: DN22
- Dialling code: 01777
- UK Parliament: Newark
- List of places UK England Nottinghamshire 53.294°N 0.836°W

Woodbeck is a village within the Rampton and Woodbeck civil parish of the Bassetlaw district, within the county of Nottinghamshire, England. The overall parish area had a population of 1,077 at the 2021 census. The village lies in the north east of the county. It is 125 miles north west of London, 27 miles north east of the city of Nottingham, and 5 miles south east of the town of Retford. It is the site of Rampton Secure Hospital, which is one of only three high security psychiatric hospitals in England.

== Toponymy ==
Woodbeck was named after the farm that was in the location originally, which was located between a 'wood and a beck', the remains of a small forested area or wood lies to the east and a beck runs alongside the area.

== Geography ==
=== Location ===
The village lies west of Rampton village, and in the far west of the Rampton and Woodbeck parish.

It is surrounded by the following local areas:

- Treswell to the north
- Stokeham to the south
- Rampton to the east
- Grove, Headon and Upton to the west.

=== Settlement ===
The village is largely taken up by the Rampton Hospital grounds, and ex-staff housing. There are some farm houses and cottages on the fringes of the location but there is very little by way of public facilities.

=== Water feature ===
The North Beck stream forms the west edge of the area.

=== Land elevation ===
The area is higher than Rampton, rising to a high of 45 metres (148 ft) west of Woodbeck.

== Governance ==
The village is managed at the first level of public administration by Rampton and Woodbeck Parish Council.

At district level, the wider area is managed by Bassetlaw District Council, and by Nottinghamshire County Council at its highest tier.

== History ==
Prior to development, the area was primarily farmland. Woodbeck was named after the local farm which was bought by the Minister of Prisons in 1907. The farmhouse was sold to the Government when the area was chosen for the building of a high security psychiatric hospital.

Initially known as Rampton Criminal Lunatic Asylum, building work was started in 1909. The hospital was originally conceived as an annex to Broadmoor Hospital with the aim of reducing overcrowding and opened in 1912. As hospital patient numbers increased in the 1920s, a programme of building staff houses was begun.

The houses were originally allocated to married staff members with families; unmarried staff were housed in two residential blocks which later opened in 1931.An increase in the number of staff saw an expansion of the staff club (previously the Woodbeck farmhouse) to include a cricket pavilion (1935) and other sports facilities.

In the 1990s the residence blocks were converted into offices and are presently located within the outer perimeter fence of the hospital. The 1990s also saw the sale of many of the houses at Woodbeck to private ownership. The staff club, shop, post office, tennis courts, bowling green and cricket pavilion were demolished to make way for a new control room and entry building on completion of the new perimeter fence in 2003.

== Community ==
Woodbeck village maintains a publicly accessible community centre and shop/cafe/licensed bar in the Rampton hospital grounds.

== Education ==
Rampton Primary School is a mile east of Woodbeck, and offers nursery facilities.

== Notable people ==
- Allen Richardson (cricketer), first-class cricketer, active 1948–52.

== See also ==
- Rampton Secure Hospital
