= Listed buildings in Treswell =

Treswell is a civil parish in the Bassetlaw District of Nottinghamshire, England. The parish contains four listed buildings that are recorded in the National Heritage List for England. Of these, one is listed at Grade I, the highest of the three grades, and the others are at Grade II, the lowest grade. The parish contains the village of Treswell and the surrounding area. All the listed buildings are in the village, and consist of a church, a farmhouse, a barn converted into a house, and a pigeoncote.

== Key ==
| Grade | Criteria |
|---|---|
| I | Buildings of exceptional interest, sometimes considered to be internationally important |
| II | Buildings of national importance and special interest |

== Buildings ==
| Name and location | Photograph | Date | Notes | Grade |
|---|---|---|---|---|
| St John the Baptist's Church; 53.30576°N 0.82851°W | | 13th century | The church has been altered and extended through the centuries, including a restoration in 1854–55. It is built in stone with slate roofs, and consists of a nave, a north aisle, a south porch, a chancel and a west tower. The tower has two stages, diagonal buttresses, a string course, an arched west window, two-light bell openings, gargoyles, and an embattled parapet. The porch has buttresses decorated with crockets and finials, and the entrance is arched and has a hood mould. The inner doorway dates from the 13th century and has a chamfered surround, and imposts with nailhead decoration. The nave and porch have embattled parapets. | I |
| The Shambles; 53.30416°N 0.83056°W | — | Early 18th century | A barn that was extended into four cottages, then combined into one house. It is in whitewashed rendered red brick, partly on a plinth, with dogtooth eaves, and a pantile roof. There are two storeys and eight bays. On the front are doorways, casement windows, and a horizontally-sliding sash window. | II |
| Pigeoncote, Brookside Farm; 53.30595°N 0.82039°W | — | Mid 18th century | The pigeoncote is in red brick, with a dentilled eaves band, a raised brick eaves band, and a pantile roof with crowstepped gables. There are two storeys and a loft. It contains doorways with segmental heads, entrances for pigeons, and owl holes. | II |
| Church Farmhouse; 53.30483°N 0.82847°W | — | Late 18th century | The farmhouse is in red brick on a plinth, with a floor band, dentilled eaves, and a hipped pantile roof. There are two storeys and six bays. On the front are three doorways, one with a fanlight and a hood on brackets. The windows are a mix of casements, and sashes, some horizontally-sliding, under segmental arches. | II |
