= Listed buildings in Stokeham =

Stokeham is a civil parish in the Bassetlaw District of Nottinghamshire, England. The parish contains two listed buildings that are recorded in the National Heritage List for England. Of these, one is listed at Grade II*, the middle of the three grades, and the other is at Grade II, the lowest grade. The parish contains the village of Stokeham and the surrounding area, and the listed buildings consist of a church, and a coffin in the churchyard.

== Key ==
Grade	Criteria
II*	Particularly important buildings of more than special interest
II	Buildings of national importance and special interest

== Buildings ==
Name and location	Photograph	Date	Notes	Grade
St Peter's Church; 53.28350°N 0.82795°W		13th century	The church has been altered and extended through the centuries, and it was restored in 1928 when the porch was added. The church is built in stone, partly rendered, and has a slate roof. It consists of a nave, a south porch, and a slightly lower chancel. At the west end is as bellcote with two arches.	II*
Coffin in churchyard 53.28344°N 0.82797°W		13th century	The coffin is in the churchyard of St Peter's Church, to the east of the south porch. It is in stone and consists of a hollow coffin.	II
