= Allen Richardson (cricketer) =

English cricketer

Allen Richardson (28 October 1926 – 20 September 1998) was an English first-class cricketer active 1948–52 who played for Nottinghamshire. He was born in Woodbeck; died in Sherwood.
