= Listed buildings in Rampton and Woodbeck, Nottinghamshire =

Rampton and Woodbeck is a civil parish in the Bassetlaw District of Nottinghamshire, England. The parish contains six listed buildings that are recorded in the National Heritage List for England. Of these, two are listed at Grade I, the highest of the three grades, and the others are at Grade II, the lowest grade. The parish contains the village of Rampton and the surrounding area. The listed buildings consist of a church, two gateways, a farmhouse and associated structures, a row of cottages, and a pair of gate piers.

== Key ==
Grade	Criteria
I	Buildings of exceptional interest, sometimes considered to be internationally important
II	Buildings of national importance and special interest

== Buildings ==
Name and location	Photograph	Date	Notes	Grade
All Saints' Church; 53.29819°N 0.80192°W		Early 13th century	The church has been altered and extended through the centuries, including restorations in 1894, 1902 and 1930. It is built in stone with slate roofs, and consists of a nave, north and south aisles, a south porch, a chancel and a west tower. The tower has two stages, bands, and a west doorway with a moulded surround, a pointed arch and a hood mould, above which is a three-light window with a hood mould, and a niche with a finial. On the south front is a clock face, the bell openings have two lights, and above them is a ball flower course and an embattled parapet.	I
Gateway from Manor Farm and wall 53.29823°N 0.80153°W		Mid 16th century	The wall is in stone with moulded and stepped coping. In the centre is a doorway in a recessed panel with a hood mould, and above are armorial panels with raised and moulded edges in decorative surrounds. Attached to the stone walls are brick walls with moulded stone coping, containing niches and ending in quoins.	I
Manor Farmhouse, outbuilding and wall 53.29831°N 0.80134°W		Early 18th century	The farmhouse is in red brick on a stone plinth with a moulded band, and has stone dressings, a moulded floor band, a raised eaves band, and a slate roof with stone coped gables and kneelers. There are two storeys and attics, and five bays. The central doorway has an architrave, a traceried fanlight, and a cornice on consoles. The windows are sashes with wedge lintels and keystones. At the rear is a single-storey four-bay outbuilding, and to its right is a lower wing. The wall is in red brick with stone coping, and contains gateways and piers, one with a shaped finial.	II
Rose Cottage, The Cottage, and 3 Torksey Street; 53.29807°N 0.79991°W		Late 18th century	A row of three cottages in red brick, with dentilled eaves, and pantile roofs with raised and coped gables and kneelers. There are two storeys and ranges of three and five bays. The windows are a mix of casements and horizontally-sliding sashes, and many of the openings have segmental heads.	II
Gateway east of All Saints' Church; 53.29802°N 0.80246°W		Mid 19th century	The gateway has a stone wall on a plinth, and at the top is stepped and moulded coping. In the centre is a pointed archway with a hood mould, and to its right is a smaller archway with a hood mould and a wrought iron gate. Above the main arch is a decorative panel.	II
Gate piers, Rampton Hospital; 53.29476°N 0.83676°W		1931	The gate piers at the principal entrance to the hospital are in red brick with stone dressings. They have square shafts stepped in at the corners, on moulded stone bases. The capitals are in the form of an entablature with a frieze of carved acanthus leaves. On the top are decorative urns with gadrooning, and handles with carved foliage, flowers and fruit.	II
