= Headon, Nottinghamshire =

Village in Nottinghamshire, England

Coordinates: 53.284°N 0.877°W

Headon
- Village
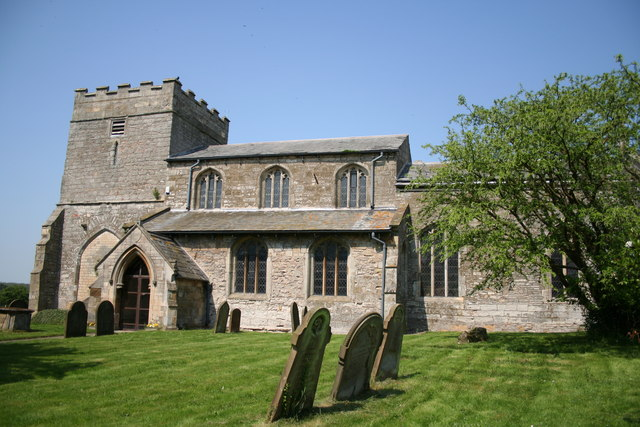
- Church of St. Peter's

- Location within Nottinghamshire
- Interactive map of Headon
- Population: 253 (2011 Census) with Upton, Nether Headon and Stokeham
- OS grid reference: SK 74900 76985
- Civil parish: Headon cum Upton
- District: Bassetlaw
- Shire county: Nottinghamshire
- Region: East Midlands
- Country: England
- Sovereign state: United Kingdom
- Post town: Retford
- Postcode district: DN22
- Dialling code: 01777
- UK Parliament: Newark

Headon is a village in Headon cum Upton civil parish, in the Bassetlaw district council area of the county of Nottinghamshire, England. The village is adjacent to the villages of Upton, Nether Headon, East Drayton, Eaton, Gamston, Woodbeck and Stokeham. In 2011 the parish, together with Stokeham had a population of 253. The area is 3 1/2 miles south east of the nearest market town Retford, 26 miles north east of the county town Nottingham and 125 miles north of London. There are two listed buildings in Headon village.

== Toponymy ==
Headon was known as Hedun in the Domesday Book and is possibly derived from the Old English for high hill.

== Geography ==
=== Location ===
The village lies in the north east portion of the Nottinghamshire county and southern area of Bassetlaw district.

It is surrounded by the following local areas:

- Nether Headon and Ladywell Rise to the north
- Upton to the south
- East Drayton, Woodbeck and Stokeham to the east
- Eaton and Gamston to the west.

=== Settlement ===
This is the main historic area and largest village within the parish. Primarily residential with several farms, it is located in the southern centre of the parish, and clustered around three roads - Yew Tree Road and Thorpe Street, with the community amenities of a church and village hall on Church Street.

=== Landscape ===
The area is low-lying. The village lies within the 98–148 feet (30–45 m) range, with the northern fringes of the village being the highest.

== Governance and demographics ==
Headon lies within Headon cum Upton civil parish for local administrative identity.

For census population purposes the parish is reported alongside Stokeham parish for a total of 253 residents.

The village is managed at the first level of public administration by the combined Headon, Grove & Stokeham Parish Council, for wider area neighbourhood purposes it is abbreviated to HUGS.

At district level, this is managed by Bassetlaw District Council.

Nottinghamshire County Council governs the wider area, managing the highest level of local services.

== History ==
Local fields have unearthed flint tools, showing the area was settled for at least 5,000 years. Several Roman pottery pieces excavated prove there were people living in the locality during Roman times. With Viking invasions the hamlet of Thorpe was eventually formed, and there was some proof that Saxons and Danes were living alongside each other, with Danish words naming local fields such as the Wong and Gooseholm. The other two villages of "up town" (Upton) and Nether Headon eventually were formed from population expansion.

Headon was recorded in the Domesday Book, being relatively notable due to six thegns or nobles being noted, each of whom had a hall. Domesday also lists that Headon had a sizeable population. This is shown by the size of the Church of St Peter, which was much larger in medieval times. The church was first reported as being in the village by 1171. An Anglo-Saxon burial mound exists in Gamston wood near the parish boundary, with another possibly at Lodge Field Clump.

There is a possible association to Robin Hood. Present day Manor Farm is probably the site of the original village manor, and remains of a moat are near this. Simon de Headon owned the manor in the 13th century and he and his son Gerard both became sheriffs of Nottinghamshire (in 1259,1267 and 1269) so one of them may have been a rival of Robin Hood's. A tomb cover depicting a knight in chain mail armour was found outside Headon church during the 1980s. It dates from c.1275, and likely belonged to one of the de Headons.

In 1710 Sir Hardolph Wasteneys built Headon Hall within the grounds of Headon Park, which was designed by Sir Thomas Hewitt. In 1792, the heir of the lordship, and son of local MP Gervase Eyre, Anthony Hardolph Eyre, demolished the Hall. He founded a school near the site which later on became the East West Cottage. During his time oak and ash tree plantations were established and hop yards and gypsum quarries provided employment for locals, by which time in 1798 numbered 286.

In 1818 some 3000 acres of open field in Headon and Upton were enclosed by Act of Parliament, creating the present layout by planting thorn hedges, digging drainage ditches and closing off footpaths. The Harcourt Vernons were successors to the Eyres, and built a new school for the village around the start of the 20th century. The school also functioned as a community centre from the beginning. The Grove Estate was sold by auction in 1946, and Headon village bought the school, via local subscriptions.

Three council houses were built by 1958, allowing for the demolition of the Sparrow Barracks cottages. Two bungalows, intended for elderly residents, were subsequently built in the cleared area.

== Culture and community ==
There is a village hall in Headon. Originally the Headon National School built at the turn of the 20th century, it replaced the previous school on the site of Headon Hall, The school closed in 1959 and was subsequently converted into the village hall.

== Religious sites ==
There is one church in the village, the Church of England parish church dedicated to St Peter. It is a listed building with a Grade I designation. Although recorded as being in the village from earlier, it has 13th-century Anglo-Saxon features.

== Economy ==
- There is a microlight aircraft field and school in Headon.

== See also ==
- Listed buildings in Headon cum Upton
