= John Keyworth Boynton =

British legal officer (1918–2007)

Sir John Keyworth Boynton MC DL (14 February 1918 – 15 January 2007) was a British legal officer. After a career as a solicitor and chief executive in local government, he was appointed as the commissioner responsible for overseeing the 1980 elections in Rhodesia, later Zimbabwe, and then led an inquiry into the alleged abuse of patients at the Rampton special psychiatric hospital in Nottinghamshire.

== Life and career ==
John Boynton was born in Carlisle and attended Glasgow Academy and Dulwich College, before taking a degree in law at London University and qualifying as a solicitor in 1939. In 1940 he joined the 15th Scottish Reconnaissance Regiment, and served in France, Germany, the Netherlands and Belgium. In February 1945 he was awarded the Military Cross for his actions in leading a tank column under enemy fire to reconnoitre and recapture the town of Kleve.

He served as a military magistrate in Germany after the end of the war, before returning to England where he worked as a solicitor for Derbyshire County Council and then as deputy clerk of the peace in Berkshire. In 1964 he moved to Cheshire, where he became clerk of the council and, after local government reorganisation in 1974, the first chief executive of the newly constituted Cheshire County Council, a post he held until 1979. He was instrumental in establishing the Society of Local Authority Chief Executives (SOLACE), and became its founding president in 1974. He was also elected president of the Royal Town Planning Institute in 1976, and was a member of the Economic Planning Council for North West England.

Upon his retirement from local government, he was appointed by the British Foreign and Commonwealth Office to oversee new national elections in Rhodesia following the Lancaster House Agreement. For the first time, these elections were to involve the rival guerrilla organisations led by Robert Mugabe and Joshua Nkomo. Despite evidence of intimidation of voters and candidates, he concluded that the elections - which resulted in Mugabe's ZANU-PF party securing a majority of seats - had been "a reflection of the wishes of the people". The country was renamed Zimbabwe a few months later.

Later in 1980, he was asked to lead an inquiry into the alleged abuse of patients at Rampton Hospital in Nottinghamshire, following revelations in a Yorkshire Television documentary. Boynton's inquiry found problems relating to the hospital's isolation, lack of leadership, and focus on containment rather than therapy. The report led to the formation of the Mental Health Act Commission, to oversee conditions under which mental patients are detained.

He co-wrote Boynton's Guide to Compulsory Purchase and Compensation (1964), and published a memoir, Job at the Top (1986).

He was appointed a deputy lieutenant of Cheshire in 1975, and was knighted in 1979. Sir John Boynton was married twice, and had two daughters.
