= Mark Rowntree =

Spree killer from Yorkshire, England

- Rowntree, pictured outside Leeds Crown Court, June 1976
- Born: Mark Andrew Rowntree; 1956 (age 69–70); Bradford, West Yorkshire, England
- Occupation: Bus conductor
- Status: Incarcerated at Rampton Secure Hospital
- Motive: Paranoia; Revenge; Infamy
- Conviction: Manslaughter (x4)
- Penalty: Indefinite detention within a psychiatric hospital

Details
- Victims: 4
- Span of crimes: 31 December 1975 – 7 January 1976
- Date apprehended: 7 January 1976

Mark Andrew Rowntree (born 1956) is a British spree killer who murdered four people in random knife attacks over a period of eight days in West Yorkshire, England, in 1975 and 1976.

Rowntree's victims were typically chosen at random. All were stabbed to death within a ten-mile radius of his adopted parents' home in Guiseley, West Yorkshire. His murders were motivated by a delusional belief that all women despised him, sourcing from a single instance of a woman rejecting his advances, in addition to a desire to surpass the total victim count of the then-recently arrested Black Panther.

Diagnosed as a paranoid schizophrenic, Rowntree pleaded guilty to four counts of manslaughter on the grounds of diminished responsibility in June 1976. He was committed indefinitely to detention within Broadmoor Hospital, and is currently an inmate within Rampton Secure Hospital.

Due to the timing and location of Rowntree's crimes, two of his victims were initially—albeit briefly—assumed to have been murdered by an unknown offender soon to be known as the Yorkshire Ripper, which briefly distracted contemporary police enquiries.

== Early life ==
Mark Andrew Rowntree was born in Bradford, West Yorkshire, in 1956. He was the adopted son of a wealthy, middle-class couple and was raised in Guiseley, where he received a stable upbringing and a public school education.

Rowntree's parents doted upon him and ensured he received a privileged upbringing. He was an above average scholar, and had achieved five O-levels and four A-levels by 1974. Upon completion of his pre-university education, his parents offered to pay for his university tuition fees; Rowntree rejected this offer and moved into lodgings in the town of Shipley in apparent hopes of improving his social life and obtaining his first long-term relationship with a girl. Shortly thereafter, he obtained employment as a bus conductor.

By late 1975, Rowntree had reconsidered his parents' offers to pay for his university education. He had applied for a scholarship within a prestigious Yorkshire university; his application had been accepted, and Rowntree planned to continue his education the following year. However, after one year living alone, he remained somewhat a loner, and had failed to obtain a girlfriend, leading him to feel all women despised him; he, in turn, began to despise women, and began hearing voices in his head instructing him to execute girls aged fifteen to twenty.

== Crimes ==
=== Grace Adamson ===
Rowntree committed his first murder on the afternoon of 31 December 1975. His first victim was an 85-year-old widow named Grace Edith Adamson, whom Rowntree observed sitting by her window inside her Bingley cottage, knitting and watching television. Rowntree knocked on Adamson's door, claiming to be a policeman; when Adamson opened her front door, Rowntree took a long-bladed commando-style knife from a bag he was carrying and stabbed the pensioner seven times in the chest, twice piercing her heart.

After fleeing from the scene, Rowntree buried the murder weapon in a cemetery, then entered a pub in nearby Cross Flatts, where he washed Adamson's blood from his hands in the toilets before ordering a pint of beer. Adamson's body was discovered the following day.

=== Stephen Wilson ===
On the afternoon of 3 January 1976, Rowntree purchased a new knife in Bradford, which he placed inside his shoulder-bag. He then travelled via public transport to Sutton-in-Craven, where he entered the Black Bull pub and purchased a pint of beer, which he drank while discussing Adamson's murder with the barmaid and remarking: "They might have let her live out her life properly." Rowntree then walked one mile to the nearby village of Eastburn, where he observed a teenage couple close to a fish and chip shop. Rowntree discreetly followed the couple from a distance, having resolved to kill one of the two. When the girl left her boyfriend—sixteen-year-old Stephen Anthony Wilson—standing alone at a bus stop and continued walking, Rowntree approached the boy and began stabbing him.

Wilson managed to flee from his attacker after receiving three stab wounds to his chest and abdomen; he staggered to the nearby residence of a school friend, where the occupants summoned an ambulance. Wilson later died in hospital, but provided police with a detailed description of his attacker before succumbing to his injuries: a white male, aged approximately twenty-two with black, shoulder-length hair and who was wearing a black jacket and carrying a backpack.

Rowntree escaped from the crime scene by swimming across a river, then hitchhiking to a nearby taxi rank, where he ordered a taxi to take him to his lodgings in Shipley.

=== Barbara and Alan Booth ===
Rowntree's final victims were 24-year-old part-time model and occasional prostitute Barbara Rose Booth—whom Rowntree had met via an advertisement she had placed in a contact magazine in 1975—and her three-year-old son, Alan. Having retained her phone number via their previous encounter, Rowntree contacted Booth to request her services, to which she agreed. He travelled by bus to her home in Greenhow Crescent, Burley, Leeds, on 7 January.

Shortly after entering Booth's home, he entered the bathroom, where he removed a knife he had taped to his leg. He then stabbed the young woman eighteen times as she stood in her living room. As Rowntree prepared to leave the home, he observed Booth's three-year-old son cowering in a corner of the living room. Rowntree then stabbed the child to death, particularly around the neck and torso. He then travelled by bus to Guiseley, where he buried the murder weapon before returning to his Shipley lodgings.

The bodies of Barbara and Alan were discovered by her common-law husband, Alan Ruddick, within hours of their murder. Initially, West Yorkshire Police did not connect their murders to those of Adamson and Wilson due to Booth being a known prostitute; their deaths were initially linked to the October 1975 stabbing and bludgeoning murder of Leeds prostitute Wilma McCann.

== Arrest and confession ==
Based on both the physical description of his attacker provided by Stephen Wilson prior to his death and recollections later given to police by the taxi driver who recalled driving a dishevelled individual matching this description from Eastburn to Shipley on the date of the fatal knife attack, by 7 January, police considered Rowntree as a strong suspect in the teenager's murder. As such, Detective Superintendent Dick Holland and several colleagues were waiting to arrest and question Rowntree upon his return to his lodgings on the evening of 7 January.

Initially, Rowntree denied the murders of Wilson and Adamson; however, after several hours of interrogation, he informed detectives: "I'll just tell you a little story which may interest you before I go to sleep. I did those two killings." He then confessed to both murders. Hours later, he admitted his culpability in the murders of Barbara and Alan Booth. Within his confessions, Rowntree explained he had selected his victims at random to satiate what he termed "an insatiable desire to kill". He denied deriving any pleasure from his attacks beyond "shocking the public" and insisted they had been devoid of any motive. Nonetheless, he did express regret at not having the opportunity to kill "just one more" victim in order to surpass the victim count of the Black Panther.

Rowntree was formally charged with all four murders on 8 January. He was ordered to undergo a psychiatric evaluation prior to trial; these examinations saw a panel of psychologists formally diagnose him with schizophrenia. Committal proceedings to bring Rowntree to trial formally began on 9 April.

== Conviction ==
Mark Rowntree was tried before Mr Justice Park at Leeds Crown Court in the first week of June 1976. The prosecution consisted of Franz Muller, with Peter Taylor Q.C. appointed to defend Rowntree.

In the opening stages of the trial, Rowntree pleaded not guilty to murder but guilty to four counts of manslaughter on the grounds of diminished responsibility. His plea was accepted by the Crown, and prosecutor Franz Muller then outlined Rowntree's crimes to the court.

Muller also informed the court Rowntree's inability to make or maintain friendships, plus his rejection from girls, had motivated him to seek revenge. Initially, he had attempted to quell his rage by smashing shop windows and bus stops; however, when these acts failed to suppress Rowntree's anger, he had chosen to murder five individuals—one more victim than the Black Panther—to achieve a sense of accomplishment and grandiosity. Each murder had brought Rowntree a "sense of elation" which was "short-lived, and the desire to kill soon returned." Muller further stated that had Rowntree not been caught on 7 January, he would undoubtedly have claimed other victims.

In defence of his client, Peter Taylor Q.C. outlined his client's background, emphasising Rowntree had never displayed any violent traits and adding the murders had been random and motiveless. Taylor also hearkened to the testimony of Dr. Ronald Ingrey-Senn, who had testified Rowntree suffered from acute schizophrenia, and who had stated: "This abnormality of the mind was of such a nature as to substantially diminish his responsibility for [his] acts."

The trial lasted less than one week. On 9 June, Rowntree was ordered to be committed to Broadmoor psychiatric hospital for an indefinite period, with Mr Justice Park stating upon imposing sentence: "It is quite plain that while at liberty you are a danger to the public and a place has been found for you at Broadmoor. You will be remanded in custody in prison until a bed at Broadmoor becomes available to you."

== Aftermath ==
In the years following his conviction, Rowntree has repeatedly changed his name; he has also been transferred to several different secure facilities. His most recent transferral dates from 2004, following a hearing at Teesside Crown Court in which Judge Peter Fox ruled he should be transferred from St Luke's Hospital to indefinite detention within a maximum-security unit at Rampton Secure Hospital under the Mental Health Act. This ruling followed an incident in which Rowntree—then known as Mark Allan Evans—had repeatedly threatened to kill a social worker named Katherine Cogley, who had informed a mental health tribunal he holds no remorse for his crimes.

There was no motive for any of the crimes. I should imagine that I am justifiably looked on with contempt by the public, but I did not get any satisfaction out of [my] dreadful actions ... I disgraced my dad and broke the hearts of the victims' relatives. They feel I am scum of the earth, but ... in that first week of 1976, something got control of my mind. I do not ever expect to be released. I do not expect compassion or forgiveness. What I did was morally unforgivable.

— Section of Rowntree's written correspondence with a Telegraph & Argus reporter (2003).

Rowntree had been incarcerated within St Luke's Hospital—a medium-security facility—for twelve years prior to his transferral back to Rampton (where he had been previously detained). Prior to this decision, he had been allowed to participate in periodic public outings—both supervised and unsupervised—to locations such as shopping centres in addition to a 1994 visit to Kielder Forest. These revelations caused a minor public outcry, forcing the Home Secretary to issue a public apology.

Rowntree remains incarcerated within Rampton Secure Hospital, and can not be discharged from the facility without Home Office approval. He remains one of Britain's longest-serving patients detained within a psychiatric hospital.

Within prison correspondence, Rowntree has repeatedly expressed no expectation of release, or of receiving forgiveness from the family members of his victims. By the 2000s, he had also expressed a desire to end his own life should the opportunity arise, stating to one reporter in 2003: "I just want to die and be erased from society's memory, of the embarrassment and inhuman individual I am."

== See also ==
- Diminished responsibility in English law
- Mental Health Act 1983

== Cited works and further reading ==
- Abrahams, Ian (2004). Hawkwind: Sonic Assassins. London: SAF Publishing. p. 273. ISBN 978-0-946-71969-3.
- Burn, Gordon (1993). Somebody's Husband, Somebody's Son: The Story of Peter Sutcliffe. London: Mandarin Publishing. pp. 164–165. ISBN 978-0-749-31331-9.
- Cobb, Richard Charles (2023). Convicting the Yorkshire Ripper: The Trial of Peter Sutcliffe. Barnsley: Pen and Sword Books. p. 163. ISBN 978-1-399-01190-7.
- Dunning, John (1992). Mindless Murders. Great Britain: Mulberry Editions. ISBN 1-873-12333-7.
- Cross, Roger (1981). The Yorkshire Ripper: The In-depth Study of a Mass Killer and His Methods. Hammersmith, London: Harper Collins Publishers. pp. 23–25. ISBN 978-0-586-05526-7.
- Lane, Brian; Gregg, Wilfred (1995) [1992]. The Encyclopedia Of Serial Killers. New York City: Berkley Books. pp. 322–323. ISBN 978-0-747-23731-0.
- Safarik, Mark; Ramsland, Katherine (2019). Spree Killers: Practical Classifications for Law Enforcement and Criminology. Oxfordshire: Taylor & Francis. ISBN 978-1-000-72745-6.
- Wade, Stephen (2005). Foul Deeds and Suspicious Deaths around Bradford. Barnsley: Wharncliffe Books. ISBN 1-903425-83-2.
- Whittington-Egan, Richard; Whittington-Egan, Molly (1992). The Murder Almanac. Glasgow: Neil Wilson Publishing. ISBN 978-1-897-78404-4.
- Wilson, Colin; Wilson, Damon (2007). The World's Most Evil Murderers: Real-Life Stories of Infamous Killers. Bath: Parragon Publishing. ISBN 978-1-405-48828-0.
