= Rampton, Nottinghamshire =

Village in Nottinghamshire, England

Coordinates: 53°17′51″N 0°48′08″W

Rampton
- Village
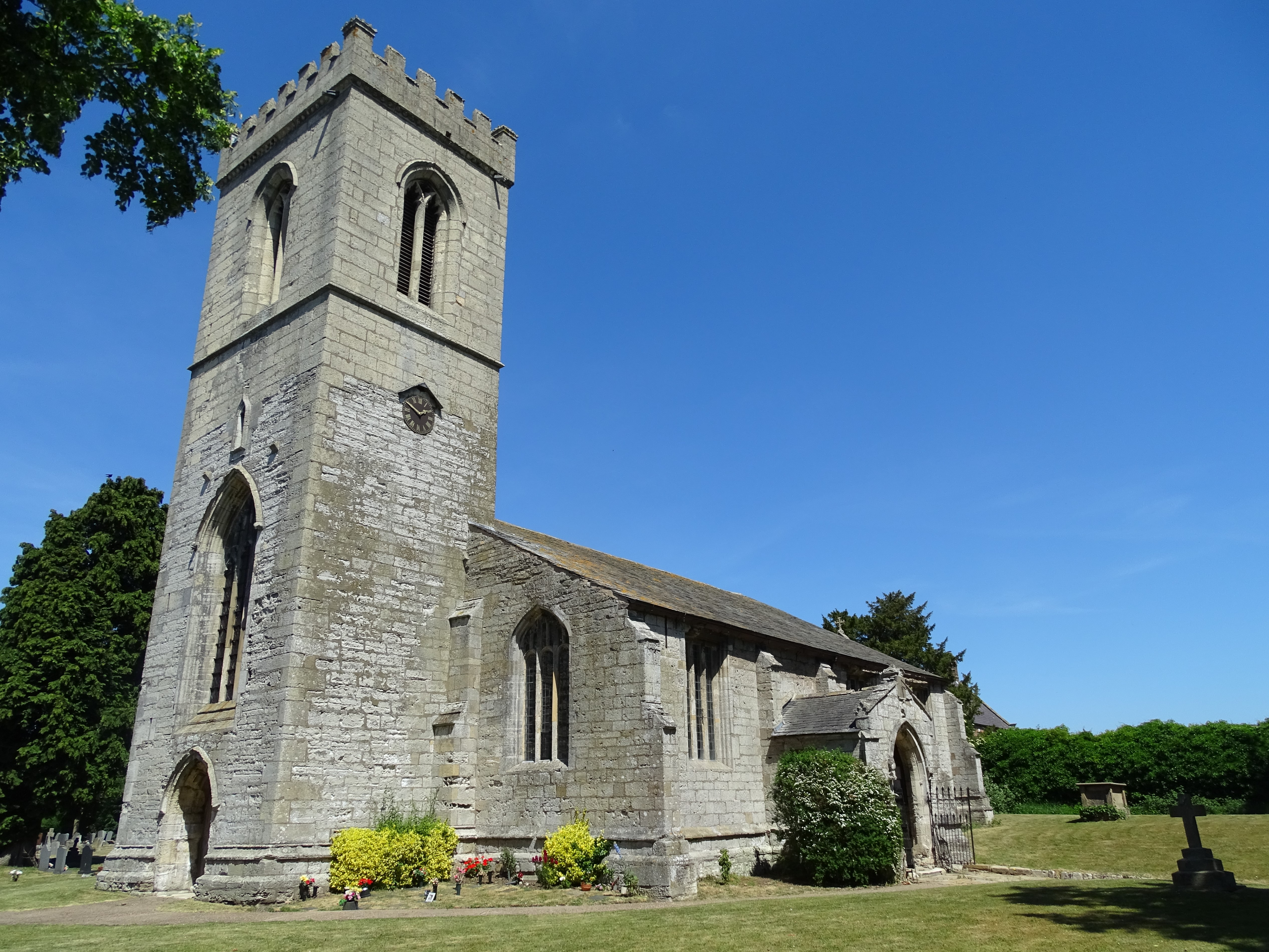
- All Saints' parish church

- Location within Nottinghamshire
- Population: 1,139 (2011 Census)
- OS grid reference: SK798785
- Civil parish: Rampton and Woodbeck
- District: Bassetlaw
- Shire county: Nottinghamshire
- Region: East Midlands
- Country: England
- Sovereign state: United Kingdom
- Post town: Retford
- Postcode district: DN22
- Dialling code: 01777
- UK Parliament: Newark

Rampton is a village in the civil parish of Rampton and Woodbeck, about 6 miles (10 km) east of Retford in the Bassetlaw district, in the county of Nottinghamshire, England. The parish is long and thin, extending about 7 miles (11 km) east–west but only about 1 mile (1.6 km) north–south. Its eastern boundary is the River Trent, which here also forms the county boundary with Lincolnshire.

The parish is best known for Rampton Secure Hospital, which is at the hamlet of Woodbeck about 1.5 miles (2.4 km) west of Rampton village. The parish was renamed from Rampton to Rampton and Woodbeck on the 1st of April 2018.

The 2011 Census recorded the parish population as 1,139.

== History ==
The toponym "Rampton" is probably derived from Old English Ramm-tūn, meaning "farmstead where rams are kept".

The village was an important manor from Norman times. The old manor house was pulled down around 1720, having been held by the Stanhope and Babington families. All that survives is the gateway, which includes the arms of Babington.

On the eastern boundary of All Saints' churchyard is a mid-16th-century Tudor gateway to Old Manor Farm. It is brick with terracotta panels and is a Grade I listed building. It used to lead to the manor house, which was demolished about 1851.

The area used to be served by Cottam railway station, just over 1 mile (1.6 km) northeast of Rampton village. The station opened in 1850 and closed in 1959.

== Rampton Manor ==
In 1892 Manchester Corporation proposed buying the Rampton Manor estate for £60,000 and using it to dispose of 20,000 tons per year of manure and street sweepings. 15,000 tons of this would have been 'good nightsoil' from privies. They proposed buying the 'exceedingly poor' land from the Eyre family. The Local Government Board rejected the borrowing needed for the scheme in December 1892 and so Rampton avoided this disaster.

== Parish church ==
The oldest part of the Church of England parish church of All Saints is a 10th-century Anglo-Saxon column in its north arcade. Most of the building is Gothic or later, from the 13th to 17th centuries. The building was restored in 1894.

The west tower is 13th-century and has a ring of six bells. George I Oldfield of Nottingham cast the third bell in 1622 and the fifth bell in 1635. Thomas Hilton of Wath-upon-Dearne cast the fourth bell in 1809. John Taylor & Co of Loughborough cast the treble, second and tenor bells in 1947. The church is a Grade I listed building.

All Saints' parish is part of the Benefice of Retford Area Team Ministry.

== Amenities ==
Rampton has a pub, the Eyre Arms, and a primary school.

== See also ==
- Listed buildings in Rampton and Woodbeck, Nottinghamshire

== Sources and further reading ==
- Mills, AD (1991). A Dictionary of British Place-Names. Oxford: Oxford University Press. ISBN 0-19-869156-4.
- Pevsner, Nikolaus; Williamson, Elizabeth (revision) (1979) [1951]. Nottinghamshire. The Buildings of England (2nd ed.). Harmondsworth: Penguin Books. pp. 292–293. ISBN 0-14-071002-7.
- Thoroton, Robert; Throsby, John (1796). Thoroton's History of Nottinghamshire: Republished With Large Additions By John Throsby. Vol. 3. Nottingham. pp. 241–248.
