= George Rampton =

English footballer

Personal information
- Date of birth: 28 October 1888
- Place of birth: Brighton, England
- Date of death: 31 March 1971 (aged 82)
- Height: 5 ft 10 in (1.78 m)
- Position: Forward

Senior career*
Years	Team	Apps	(Gls)
1906–1907	Nuneaton PSA		
1907–1908	Atherstone Town		
1908–1909	Nuneaton Town		
1909–1910	Stafford Rangers		
1910–1911	Walsall		
1911–1915	Grimsby Town	73	(30)
- * Club domestic league appearances and goals

George Rampton (28 October 1888 – 31 March 1971) was an English professional footballer who played as a forward.
