= Upton, Bassetlaw =

Village in Bassetlaw, Nottinghamshire, England

Coordinates: 53°16′40″N 0°52′53″W

Upton
- Village
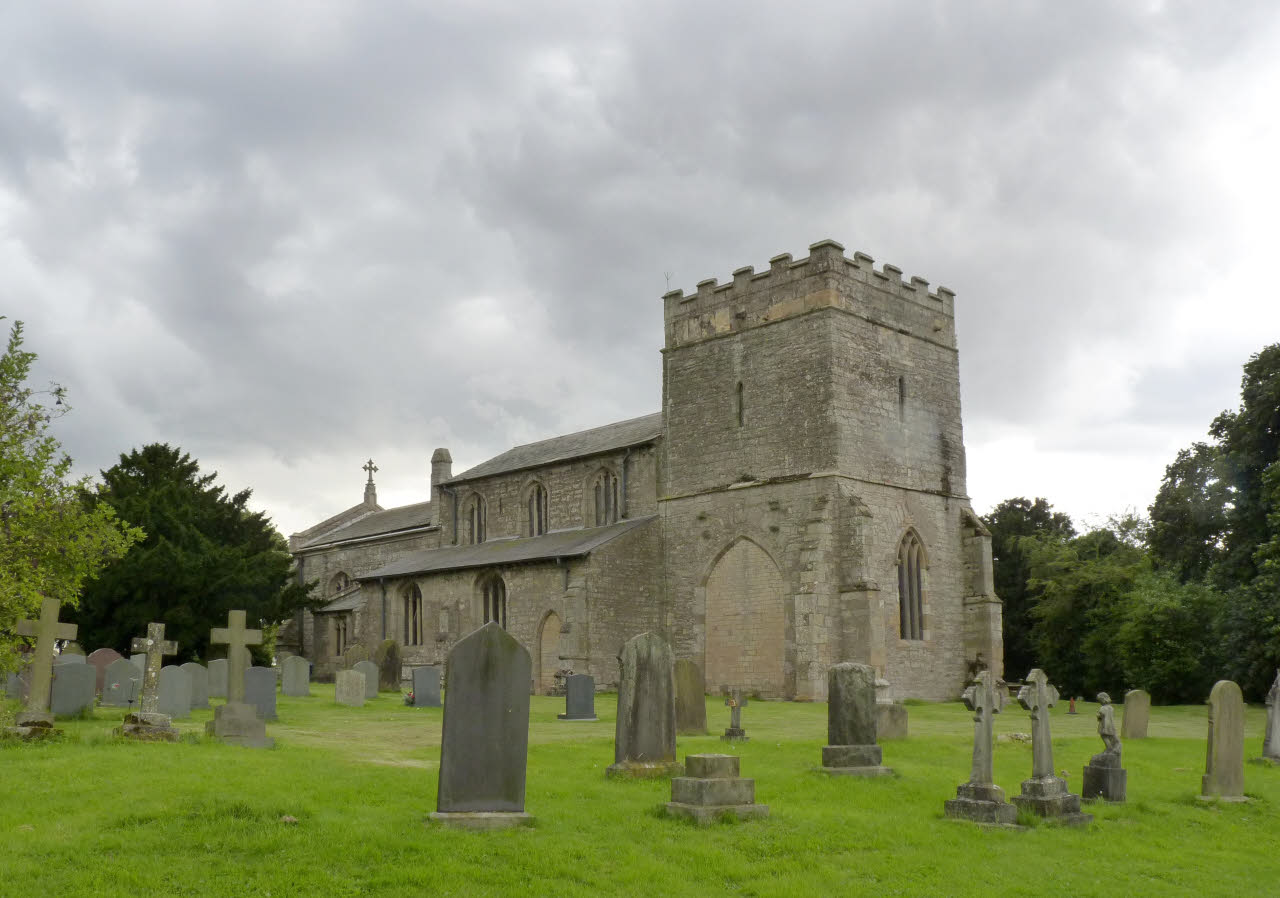
- St Peter’s Church

- Location within Nottinghamshire
- Population: 253 (2011 Census) with Headon, Upton and Stokeham
- OS grid reference: SK 74802 77743
- Civil parish: Headon cum Upton
- District: Bassetlaw
- Shire county: Nottinghamshire
- Region: East Midlands
- Country: England
- Sovereign state: United Kingdom
- Post town: Retford
- Postcode district: DN22
- Dialling code: 01777
- UK Parliament: Newark

Upton is a small village in the English county of Nottinghamshire. It is located north of Askham and south of Headon; with the latter it forms the civil parish of Headon cum Upton. The population of this civil parish at the 2011 census was 253.

== See also ==
- Listed buildings in Headon cum Upton
