= Treswell =

Village and civil parish in Nottinghamshire, England

Coordinates: 53.3°N 0.82°W

- Village and civil parish
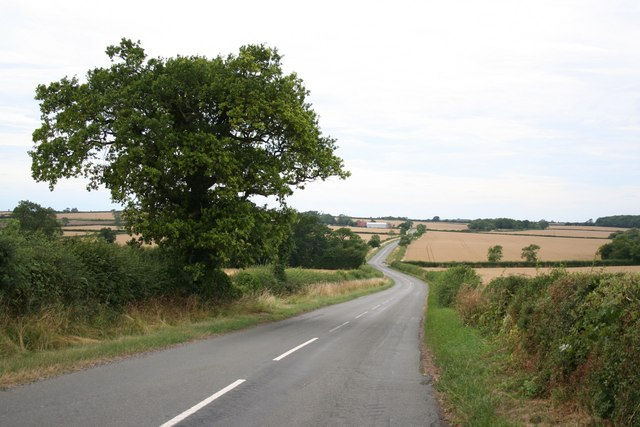
- Hazelwood Lane

- Location within Nottinghamshire
- Interactive map of Treswell
- Area: 2.42 sq mi (6.3 km^{2})
- Population: 241 (2021)
  - Density: 100/sq mi (39/km^{2})
- OS grid reference: SK 782792
  - London: 125 mi (201 km) SSE
- District: Bassetlaw
- Shire county: Nottinghamshire
- Region: East Midlands
- Country: England
- Sovereign state: United Kingdom
- Post town: RETFORD
- Postcode district: DN22
- Dialling code: 01777
- Police: Nottinghamshire
- Fire: Nottinghamshire
- Ambulance: East Midlands
- UK Parliament: Newark

Treswell is a village in north Nottinghamshire in England. The village is under the administration of Bassetlaw Council and Treswell parish council. According to the 2001 census it had a population of 231, falling to 211 at the 2011 census, and increasing to 241 at the 2021 census.

Its name is recorded in the Domesday Book as Tireswelle and probably came from Anglo-Saxon Tīres wella = "well or spring belonging to Tīr".

== Buildings ==
The village has a population of 260 living in 83 dwellings. Treswell has one post box, an old fashioned red telephone booth, a bus stop, a petrol and service garage and an active village hall. The village also has a 19th-century Methodist church but this recently closed and is being converted into a house.

The parish church of St John the Baptist is built in the Perpendicular style. The main structure dates from the thirteenth, fourteenth and fifteenth centuries, although it was restored in 1855, the square tower was restored in 1900, and internally the furniture dates from the nineteenth century. It has been a grade I listed building since 1967.

Rampton Secure Hospital is nearby.

== History ==
Treswell has rarely featured in history, but it was the home of Tom Otter, who murdered his wife of one day in a field at Drinsey Nook, near Saxilby in 1805. He was referred to as "Thomas Otter otherwise Temporel." Otter was probably married already, and his new 'wife' was already pregnant; he had also been drinking at the Sun Inn, Saxilby, where the inquest was held. Joseph Rodgers, in The Scenery of Sherwood Forest, refers to Treswell as his origin and the 'Stamford Mercury' reported him as from 'Truswell'. Otter was hung in Lincoln then gibbeted at the spot where he committed the crime, still commemorated in the name of Otter's Bridge Service Station nearby. A number of sinister events were linked to his case, with mementos of the crime disappearing from pubs such as the Drinsey Nook – only to reappear at the scene of the crime. The gibbet supposedly collapsed on a workman while being erected, killing him. Years afterwards a dying old man confessed to having witnessed the murder when awoken from a drunken sleep in a field nearby.

== Oilfield ==
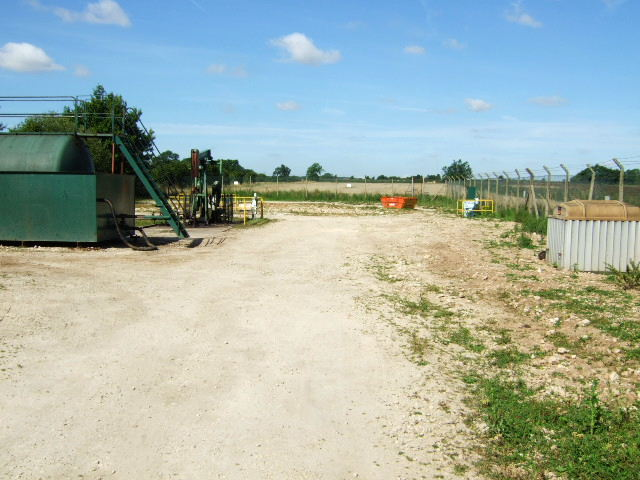
One of the "nodding donkey" oil pumps at Treswell

Treswell is over the South Leverton oilfield which runs beneath it, and there are four nodding donkey oil pumps over well heads to the north east of the village. The field produces high-grade crude oil, which is taken by road to a collection centre at Gainsborough, from where it is transferred by rail to be refined at Immingham. Because of its quality, it is used for the production of chemicals and plastics, rather than for fuel. Oil was discovered here in the late 1950s or early 1960s, after Dr Mosaddeq took power in Iran and nationalised the oil industry there. Displaced engineers working for BP returned to the UK, and South Leverton oilfield was one of several which were identified at that time as a result of their exploration skills.

== See also ==
- Listed buildings in Treswell
