= Wasteneys baronets =

Extinct baronetcy in the Baronetage of England

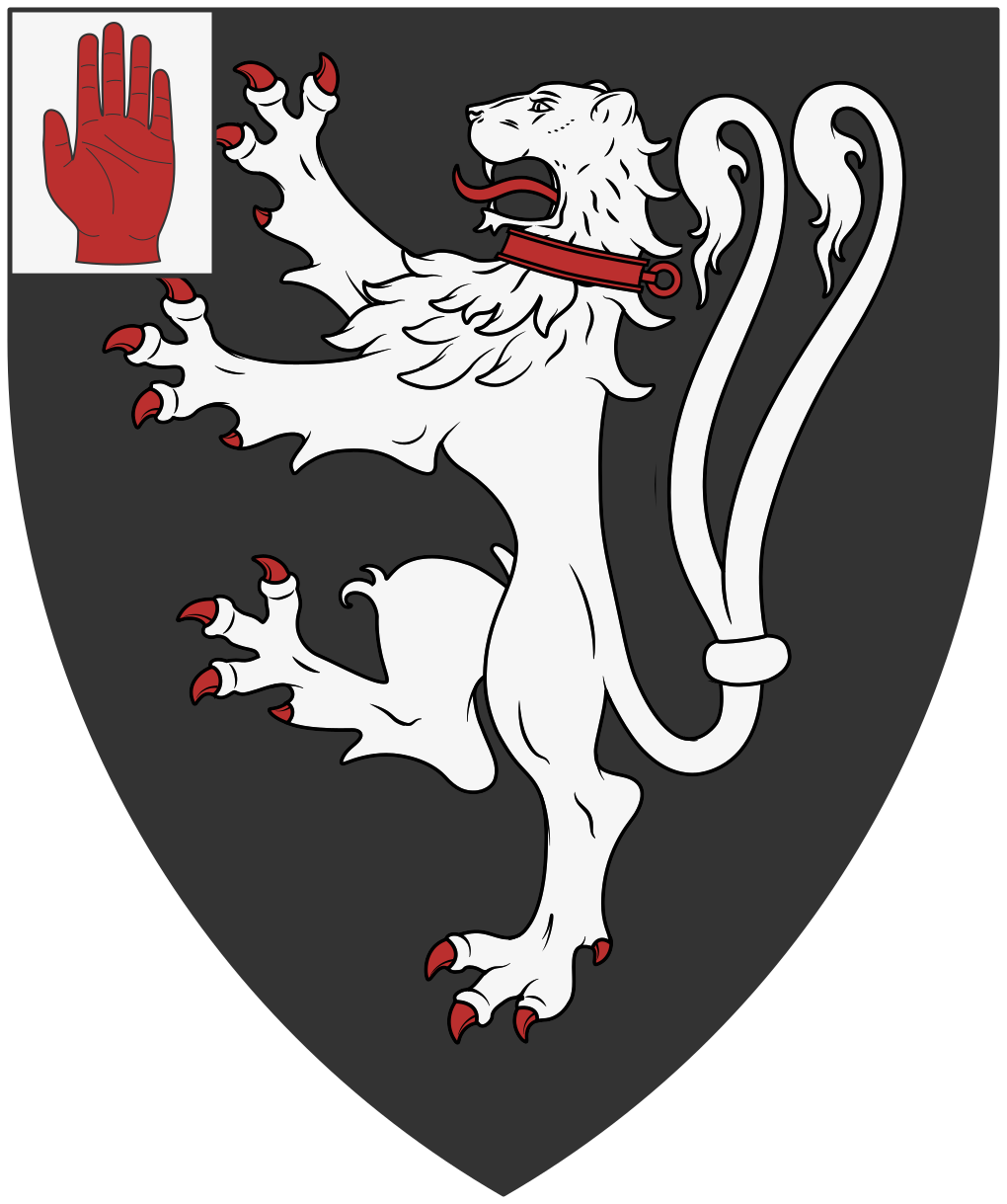
Arms of Wasteneys of Headon

The Wasteneys Baronetcy, of Headon in the County of Nottingham, was a title in the Baronetage of England. It was created on 18 December 1622 for Hardolph Wasteneys. The fourth Baronet was member of parliament for East Retford. The title became extinct on his death in 1742.

== Wasteneys baronets, of Headon (1622) ==
- Sir Hardolph Wasteneys, 1st Baronet (died 1649)
- Sir Hardolph Wasteneys, 2nd Baronet (c. 1612–1673)
- Sir Edmund Wasteneys, 3rd Baronet (died 1678)
- Sir Hardolph Wasteneys, 4th Baronet (1674–1742)
