= Rampton Secure Hospital =

English psychiatric hospital

- Nottinghamshire Healthcare NHS Foundation Trust
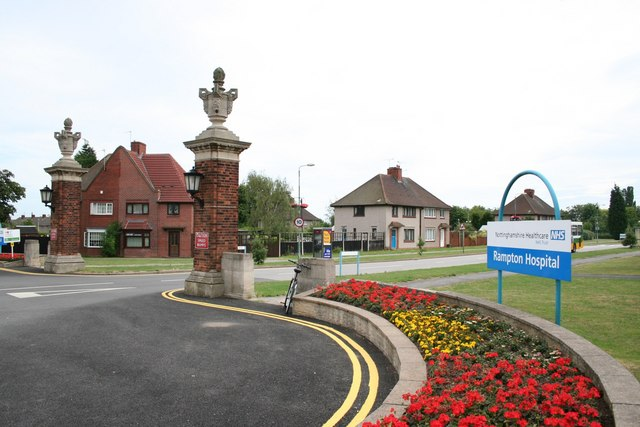
- Entrance to Rampton Secure Hospital

- Shown in Nottinghamshire

Geography
- Location: Woodbeck, Nottinghamshire, England
- Coordinates: 53.2899°N 0.8365°W

Organisation
- Care system: NHS
- Type: Specialist

Services
- Emergency department: No
- Beds: about 390
- Speciality: Psychiatric hospital (secure mental hospital)

History
- Founded: 1912; 114 years ago

Links
- Website: www.nottinghamshirehealthcare.nhs.uk/rampton-hospital
- Lists: Hospitals in England

Rampton Secure Hospital is a high-security psychiatric hospital near the village of Woodbeck between Retford and Rampton in Nottinghamshire, England. It is one of three high-security psychiatric hospitals in England, alongside Ashworth Hospital in Merseyside and Broadmoor Hospital in Berkshire. It is managed by Nottinghamshire Healthcare NHS Foundation Trust.

== History ==
In 1899 the Lunacy Commissioners decided an additional facility was required as "overspill" for Broadmoor Asylum in Berkshire. Three sites were assessed in Nottinghamshire and Woodbeck Farm was chosen because of its proximity to a large supply of soft water. The farm was later to give its name to the housing built for staff.

The site was acquired in 1907 and building began in 1909, with the original building being designed by Francis William Troup. The facility opened in 1912 as Rampton Criminal Lunatic Asylum.

During the First World War, Broadmoor revised its discharge policy. This meant there were many more beds available and Rampton was no longer needed. Remaining staff and patients were transferred to Broadmoor and the Rampton site was temporarily closed in February 1920.

Some female patients were transferred to Warwick State Institution from 1923. Female patients who were classified as more 'hopeful' were kept at Rampton for specialised training. Some women were sent into domestic service.

Historically children could also be admitted to Rampton under the Mental Deficiency Act 1913. In the 1930s a children's section and school were opened within the hospital for child patients. The average age of the patients being estimated at 12 years old. A Hansard record from December 1957 indicates that at that time 16 children were being held at Rampton, of whom one had been just 5 years old at the time of his admission in 1953. In the case of that child the reason given for his admission was that he was 'unmanageable in the convent where he then was' and there was no vacancy for him in a 'mental deficiency hospital'.

The Second World War caused staff shortages and therapeutic occupational activities had to be limited. Patients contributed to the war effort by knitting hats, gloves and pullovers and growing food.

When the National Health Service (NHS) was introduced in 1948, Rampton was transferred to the Ministry of Health, although it remained under the management of the Board of Control. The Mental Health Act 1959 saw Rampton recategorized as a Special Hospital and the Ministry of Health assumed responsibility (this was later taken over by the Department of Health and Social Services). The three UK special hospitals, including Rampton, were managed through the Special Hospitals Office Committee.

In 1962 the Special Hospitals Office Committee (SHOC) stated that it was undesirable to have children under 10 admitted to Rampton, but under 18s continued to be admitted into the 1980s.

In 1967 the League of Friends of Rampton Hospital was established to provide patient comforts, transport for relatives, and a volunteer befriending scheme. The Patient Amenities Fund was formed in 1969 through a bequest from Mrs Phoebe Boddy to provide comforts and amenities to patients. This was wound up in 1998.

In February 2000, the hospital was awarded a Charter Mark award. This government scheme was designed to both reward excellence and encourage constant quality improvement. The scheme laid emphasis on the quality of service provided to users including visitors and the general public.

In 2001 Rampton Hospital Authority was renamed Rampton Secure Hospital. In April of that year, the hospital, which had previously been administered by the Home Office, became managed by the new Nottinghamshire Healthcare NHS Trust, a provider of mental health services in the local area.

== Current services ==
Rampton Hospital houses about 400 patients who have been detained under the Mental Health Act 1983 under the criteria of "mental disorder" (any disorder or disability of mind). It has a staff of about 2,000 and provides the national services for patients with a learning disability, women and deaf men requiring high-security care. It also provides services for men with mental illness and personality disorders. The hospital has an 'Enhanced Personality Disorder' unit originally opened in 2004 as part of a national pilot for 'Dangerous and Severe Personality Disordered' men.

== Buildings and facilities ==
The Mike Harris Centre is a new training building named after the consultant forensic psychiatrist who led the forensic division of Nottinghamshire Healthcare NHS Trust, opening in January 2011.

The David Wilson Unit, for National High Secure Learning Disability Services, opened in July 2011.

== Staff ==
In 1920 staff worked 60 hour weeks for £50 per year, which was a wage comparable with farm labourers. Prior to the Second World War, they were required to live on-site, partly because of the remoteness of the site which was regularly cut off by snow in winter. There were quarters for single staff and houses for married male staff and their families. A housing estate - named Woodbeck - was built for this purpose along with other facilities. These included an outdoor arena, an indoor gymnasium and a swimming pool, which were added in the 1960s.

During the hospital's history it has sometimes been hard to recruit and retain staff - for example, during the war years, because of its isolated location and because of the, at times, stressful nature of the work. Staff are sometimes injured by patients who can be violent as well as mentally ill. A report released under the Freedom of Information Act 2000 said that 4,000 attacks were recorded between 2004 and 2006 on staff in the UK's three high-security special hospitals, including Rampton, equating to 27 attacks per week on average.

Coral Ward, a six-bed unit within the National High Secure Healthcare Service for Women, which cares for complex and challenging patients with mental illness, personality disorders and learning disabilities, won the Team of the Year award at the 2019 HSJ Patient Safety Awards.

== Criticism ==
On 22 May 1979, Yorkshire Television broadcast an exposé programme titled Rampton, The Secret Hospital, alleging many serious instances of ill-treatment of patients by members of the staff at the hospital. It was billed as a groundbreaking look inside the hitherto 'secret world' of a special hospital, and has been cited in a "top ten" of television programmes which occasioned intense public debate, being awarded an International Emmy.

A follow-up television broadcast a few weeks later further alleged that the immediate effect within the hospital had amounted to a few scapegoat prosecutions while the status quo continued as before, except that no staff member could trust another not to be a whistle-blower.

The documentary led to an inquiry by Sir John Boynton. The report found serious problems relating to the geographical and professional isolation of the hospital, its failure of leadership and its difficulty in recruiting staff as well as its focus on containing troublesome patients rather than providing proper therapy for them. Boynton was also highly critical of the internal complaints procedure: out of 178 complaints not a single one had been upheld over a four-year period. The report was also highly critical of the hospital's management structure, saying that it was overreliant on central government, and made 205 recommendations. Boynton suggested strengthening the management and recommended that a Review Board should be set up to oversee the implementation of his recommendations. Other recommendations included a longer day for patients, greater integration between the sexes (both of patients and staff), and a smaller patient population (to 500/600 beds).

However, the documentary was controversial and was rebuffed by (among others) Bassetlaw MP Joe Ashton, who pointed out that far from being 'secret', Rampton had been subjected to regular reports and examinations by a wide variety of public bodies over many years; that it saw over 1,000 visitors a year; and that the two patients who made the allegations were not reliable witnesses, as they both had serious mental health problems and had committed serious crimes after being released. Ashton highlighted a wide range of issues he regarded as being unfair in subsequent media coverage and characterised the situation as "trial by television", commenting that staff were unable to refute the allegations because they were bound by the Official Secrets Act and the confidentiality requirements of their job. He noted that the Boynton report did not uphold the core allegations: "It recommended about 200 changes to the hospital, of which 195 were fairly trivial technical administrative changes which were in progress anyway. The vast majority of the evidence of the Boynton committee exonerated the staff and found that there was no evidence of brutality or practices such as [the allegations of] using a wet towel around the neck to restrain patients". However, as a result of the Boynton Report the government introduced the Mental Health Act 1983. The act, among other matters, enhanced the importance of a patient's consent to treatment.

Rampton was rated as "inadequate" by the Care Quality Commission in 2019 - this was mainly due to low staffing levels. The standard was said to have fallen since 2018, when it was rated as "requiring improvement".

In December 2019 the trust set up a dedicated improvement board to try to "deal with cultural issues" which includes representatives of NHS England, the General Medical Council, the Nursing and Midwifery Council, and the Care Quality Commission.

== Patients ==
=== High-profile patients and former patients ===
- Beverley Allitt - Serial killer who killed four children and attacked nine others when working as a nurse at a Lincolnshire hospital in 1991.
- Ian Ball - Attempted kidnapper of Princess Anne in 1974.
- Charles Bronson - Notorious British criminal responsible for many assaults, riots, hostage situations, and robberies.
- Peter Bryan - Cannibalistic serial killer who murdered three people in London between 1993 and 2004, eating parts of their bodies after killing them.
- David Carrick - Serial rapist and former Metropolitan Police officer admitted to Rampton following a suicide attempt whilst on remand at HMP Belmarsh.
- Stephen Shaun Griffiths - Serial killer nicknamed 'The Crossbow Cannibal' responsible for at least three murders (possibly as many as eleven).
- Ian Huntley - Perpetrator of the Soham murders at Soham, Cambridgeshire, in August 2002, was detained at the hospital for nearly two months after his arrest, but transferred to a mainstream prison on remand after being declared fit to stand trial.
- Bruce George Peter Lee - One of the most prolific serial killers in UK history, responsible for the deaths of 26 people within a six-year span.
- Thomas McDowell - Murderer of German trainee Reform rabbi Andreas Hinz in North London.
- Mark Rowntree - Spree killer who in 1976 admitted murdering four people in West Yorkshire.
- Eltiona Skana - Stabbed to death seven-year-old girl in Bolton park in March 2020.
- Deividas Skebas - Found responsible for the 2022 killing of 9 year old Lilia Valutyte. Detained indefinitely at Rampton due to being unfit to stand trial.

=== Legal action by patients ===
In May 2008, a group of patients lost their High Court battle seeking to overturn the rule banning patients from smoking within the hospital.

== See also ==
- Carstairs State Hospital, the equivalent facility for Scotland and Northern Ireland.
- Listed buildings in Rampton and Woodbeck, Nottinghamshire
