= Stokeham =

Village and civil parish in Nottinghamshire. England

Coordinates: 53.283257°N 0.82628627°W

- Village and civil parish
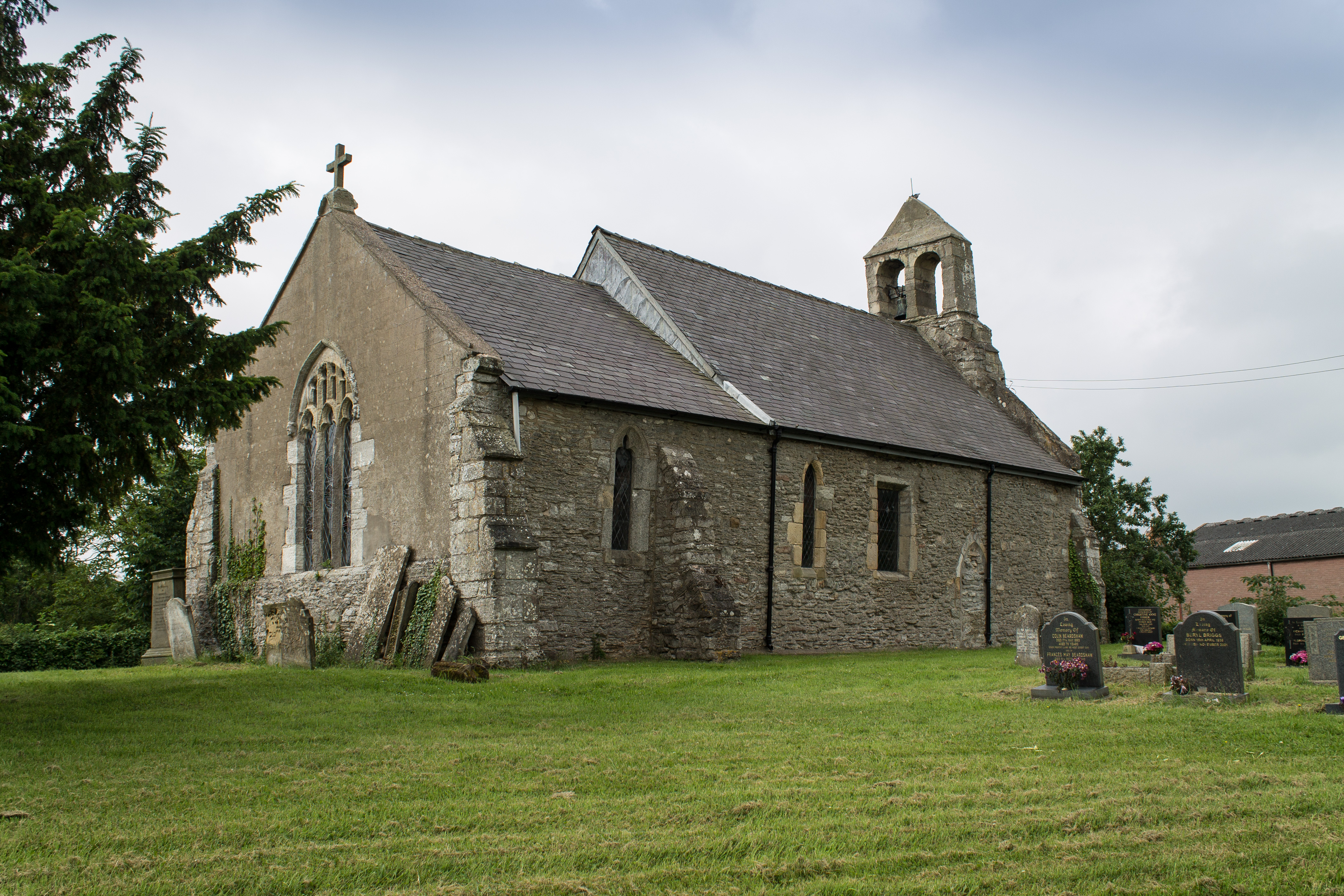
- St Peters church, Stokeham

- Location within Nottinghamshire
- Interactive map of Stokeham
- Area: 0.94 sq mi (2.4 km^{2})
- Population: 44 (2021)
  - Density: 47/sq mi (18/km^{2})
- OS grid reference: SK 783769
  - London: 125 mi (201 km) SSE
- District: Bassetlaw
- Shire county: Nottinghamshire
- Region: East Midlands
- Country: England
- Sovereign state: United Kingdom
- Post town: RETFORD
- Postcode district: DN22
- Dialling code: 01777
- Police: Nottinghamshire
- Fire: Nottinghamshire
- Ambulance: East Midlands
- UK Parliament: Newark
- Website: hugsparishcouncil.co.uk

Stokeham is a small village and civil parish in the Bassetlaw district, in the county of Nottinghamshire, England. In 1961 the parish had a population of 66, but this had dropped to 44 by the time of the 2021 census. Stokeham was recorded in the Domesday Book as Estoches.

== Methodism ==
The village had a small Methodist chapel, now derelict.

An article in the Transactions of the Thoroton Society referred to John Otter organising ‘mass missionary meetings’ in Stokeham every June. Otter was a common family name in the area with Otters also in Rampton and Laneham – where John seems to have been born in about 1813 according to the 1851 Census.

Missionary meetings were held in Stokeham every June, having started after the visit of a Dr John Hannah, a celebrated Lincoln Methodist, in 1824. Otter was also a poet and in 1857 published a book of his poems called ‘Poetical Musings’. This contains Otter’s reflections on all sorts of missionary activity across the world, and especially on missionaries’ deaths. One of the poems is a reflection on the death in Fiji of Nottinghamshire missionary John Hunt – the gravestones of his wife and daughter are at Newton on Trent.

An eyewitness account of one of the Stokeham meetings is provided in the ‘Wesleyan Missionary Notices’ of 1872 ‘…in 1851, I was at a village called Stokeham, where good old John Otter lived. I remember going to the Anniversary at that hamlet which contained, I think, five houses and a church, and what did we see? From end to end, directly we got near the place, there were – not cabs, nothing half so grand – but carts, gigs, phaetons, waggons and all sorts of things except wheelbarrows upon which people could be brought. Then when you got to Mr Otter’s place you found him beaming, all in his element. There was a large tent erected, and there I had the honour of shaking hands with the widow, just returned, of the late Rev John Hunt. There was tea in the tent, and a capital meeting in a great barn, and they made such a fuss and disturbance that they got people to come from…twenty miles around.’

The Wesleyan Missionary Notices recorded that the 1851 meeting raised £70 for foreign missionary work, about £9,500 today. John Otter of Stokeham was recorded in the 1851 Census as a farmer of 165 acres.

== Church of England ==
In 1845 William Goodacre became the incumbent of the parishes of Stokeham, East Drayton and Askham. His wife died in 1845 and he took an housekeeper, Sarah Johnson, who had a child whilst living at the vicarage in Stokeham. William Otter, churchwarden of Stokeham, made a complaint which led to an ecclesiastical inquisition at Retford in 1856. Witnesses were only able to comment on rumours and, since the mother refused to name the father of the child, Rev Goodacre was acquitted.

== See also ==
- Listed buildings in Stokeham

== External sites ==
- YouTube video - parish visit journal
