= Styrrup with Oldcotes =

Coordinates: 53.4019°N 1.084°W

- Civil parish
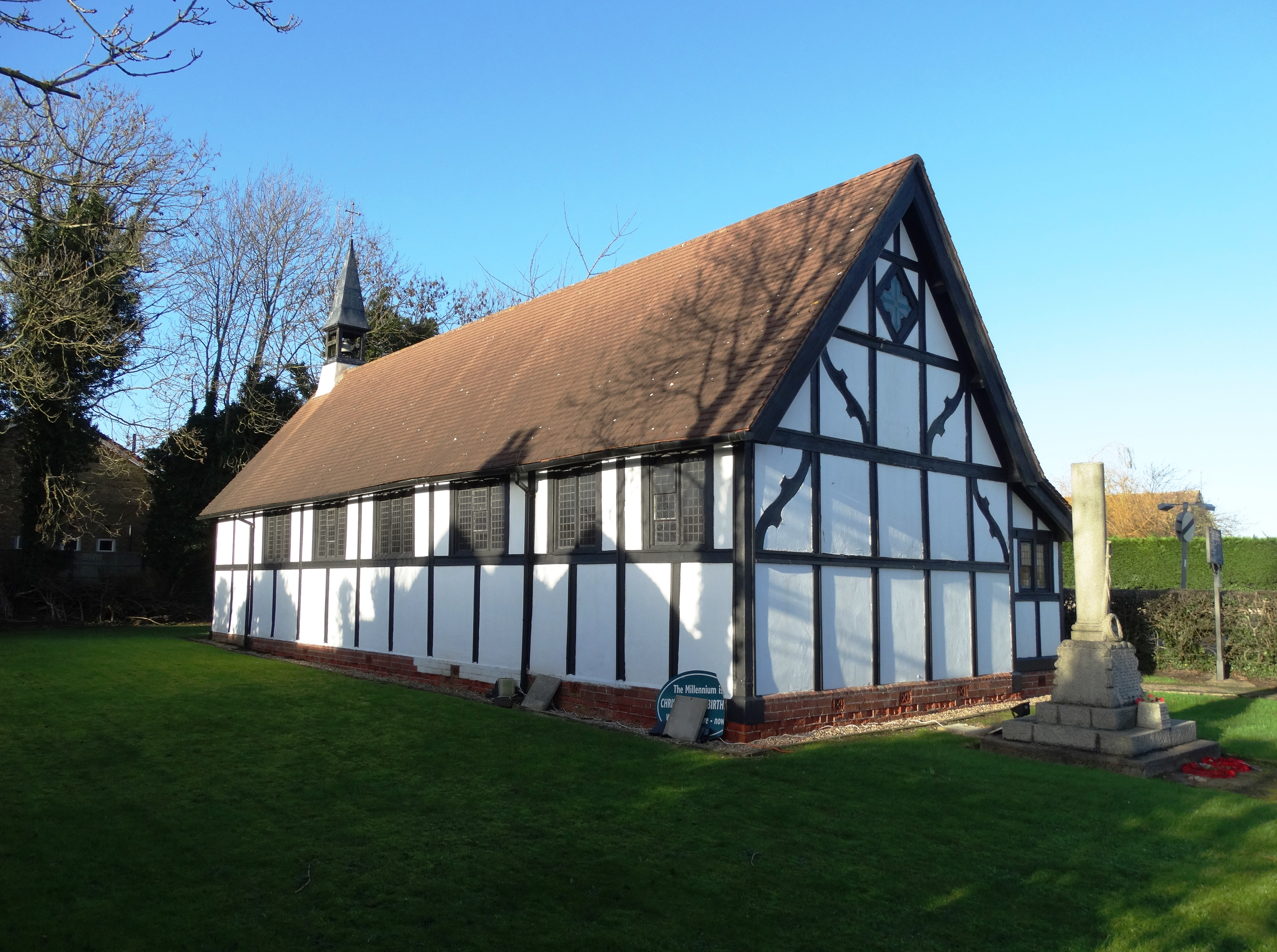
- St Marks Church

- Location within Nottinghamshire
- Interactive map of Styrrup with Oldcotes
- Area: 4.8 sq mi (12 km^{2})
- Population: 731 (2021 census)
  - Density: 152/sq mi (59/km^{2})
- OS grid reference: SK 600898
- District: Bassetlaw
- Shire county: Nottinghamshire
- Region: East Midlands
- Country: England
- Sovereign state: United Kingdom
- Main settlements: Oldcotes, Styrrup
- Post town: WORKSOP
- Postcode district: S81
- Post town: DONCASTER
- Postcode district: DN11
- Dialling code: 01302 / 01909
- Police: Nottinghamshire
- Fire: Nottinghamshire
- Ambulance: East Midlands
- UK Parliament: Bassetlaw
- Website: styrrupoldcotesparishcouncil.co.uk

Styrrup with Oldcotes is a civil parish in the Bassetlaw district, within the county of Nottinghamshire, England. The overall area had a population of 731 at the 2021 census, an increase from 684 at the 2011 census. The parish lies in the north of the county. It is 31 miles north of Nottingham, and 15 miles east of Sheffield. The parish rests alongside the county border with South Yorkshire.

== Toponymy ==
Styrrup is mentioned in the Domesday Book in 1086 as Estirape, the name having some topographical meaning (perhaps regarding the shape of a nearby hill). Oldcotes derives from 'owl-cottages', having changed through forms such as Ullcoats and Oldcoates to its present spelling. The parish was singularly called Styrrup until 1951.

== Geography ==
=== Location ===
The parish lies along the north west boundary of the Nottinghamshire and South Yorkshire border.

It is surrounded by the following local areas:

- Tickhill, Harworth and Bircotes to the north
- Langold, Hodsock and Blyth to the south
- Ranskill and Scrooby to the east
- Firbeck and Maltby to the west.

=== Settlements ===
The parish consists of two settlements:

- Oldcotes
- Styrrup

==== Oldcotes ====
This lies 1.5 miles (2.4 km) south west of Styrrup along the southern border. It is focused around the A634 Maltby to Blyth road, and the A60.

==== Styrrup ====
Styrrup is based in the north of the parish, lying just to the left of the A1(M) trunk road. It is a linear settlement, clustered mainly around Main Street on the B6463 road.

=== Landscape ===
Predominantly, many of the parish residents are clustered around the villages. Outside of these is a scattering of farms, farmhouses and cottages amongst a wider rural setting.

Several small wooded areas exist mainly to the centre and east of the parish.

==== Water features ====
- River Ryton forms the east boundary of the parish
- River Torne is to the north west along the county border
- Oldcotes Dyke is the south border of the parish. It is a tributary of the Ryton, but branches from it in the adjacent Blyth parish.

==== Land elevation ====
The parish is relatively low-lying. The land height varies from 10 metres (33 ft) in the south to 35 metres (115 ft) in the centre and west.

There is a spoil heap which was used by the former Harworth Colliery, this rises to 80 metres (260 ft).

== Governance ==
Although discrete settlements, these are managed at the first level of public administration as Styrrup with Oldcotes Parish Council.

At district level, the wider area is managed by Bassetlaw District Council, and by Nottinghamshire County Council at its highest tier.

== History ==
Much of the area was owned by the Duchy of Lancaster. A notable Lord of the manor by the middle 1800s was Viscount Galway of nearby Serlby Hall, with holdings around Styrrup. There was once an association with Styrrup and Oldcotes as townships under the parishes of Blyth and Harworth. The common land was enclosed in 1802. Edward Chaloner, a Liverpool timber businessman built a number of buildings in Oldcotes including the Catholic church in the mid 19th century. The Wesleyan chapel was erected in 1840. Oldcotes had an extensive brewery in the mid 1800s formed by the Smith and Nephew business. The East Lodge was built in 1855 and is associated to the nearby Hermeston Hall, of the east edge of Oldcotes village. A number of water mills were established in the area around Oldcotes Dyke about this time. In earlier times a lake called White Water existed and was the only natural lake in the county, it had since been drained in the 1800s by William Mellish and turned into farmland. The A1(M) Doncaster bypass in the area opened in 1961. The area was surrounded by collieries; Firbeck and Harworth were linked by railway branches from what is now the freight-only South Yorkshire Joint Railway, the lines going through the west and north of the parish, with the mines closing in 1968 and 2006 respectively.

== Economy ==
The Brunel Park Industrial Estate is in the north of the parish, east of Styrrup.

There is a public house in Oldcotes, The King William IV.

A Sunday market and car boot site lies alongside the A634 road in the south of the parish.

Styrrup Hall is a modern golf and country club and was established in 2000 on former agricultural land. The nearby former Styrrup Hall is a farm and private residence.

== Religious sites ==
There are two churches, both in Oldcotes village:

- Church of St. Mark, which is a Church of England parish church;
- St. Helen's Rectory, which is Roman Catholic.

There is a Wesleyan chapel building in Oldcotes which has been deconsecrated and is now a private dwelling.

== Landmarks ==
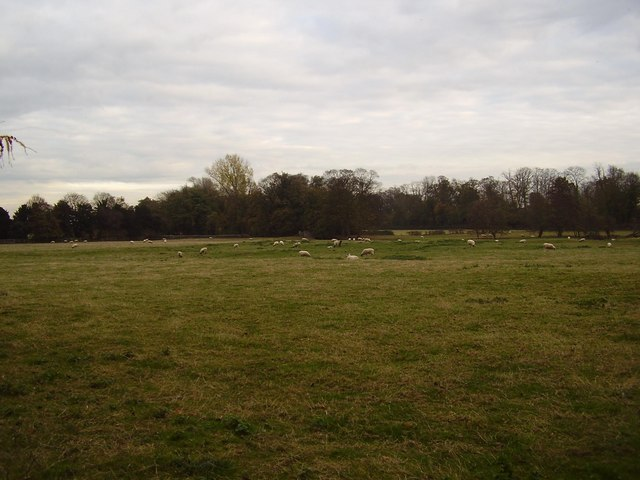
Oldcotes Roman villa site

=== Protected areas ===
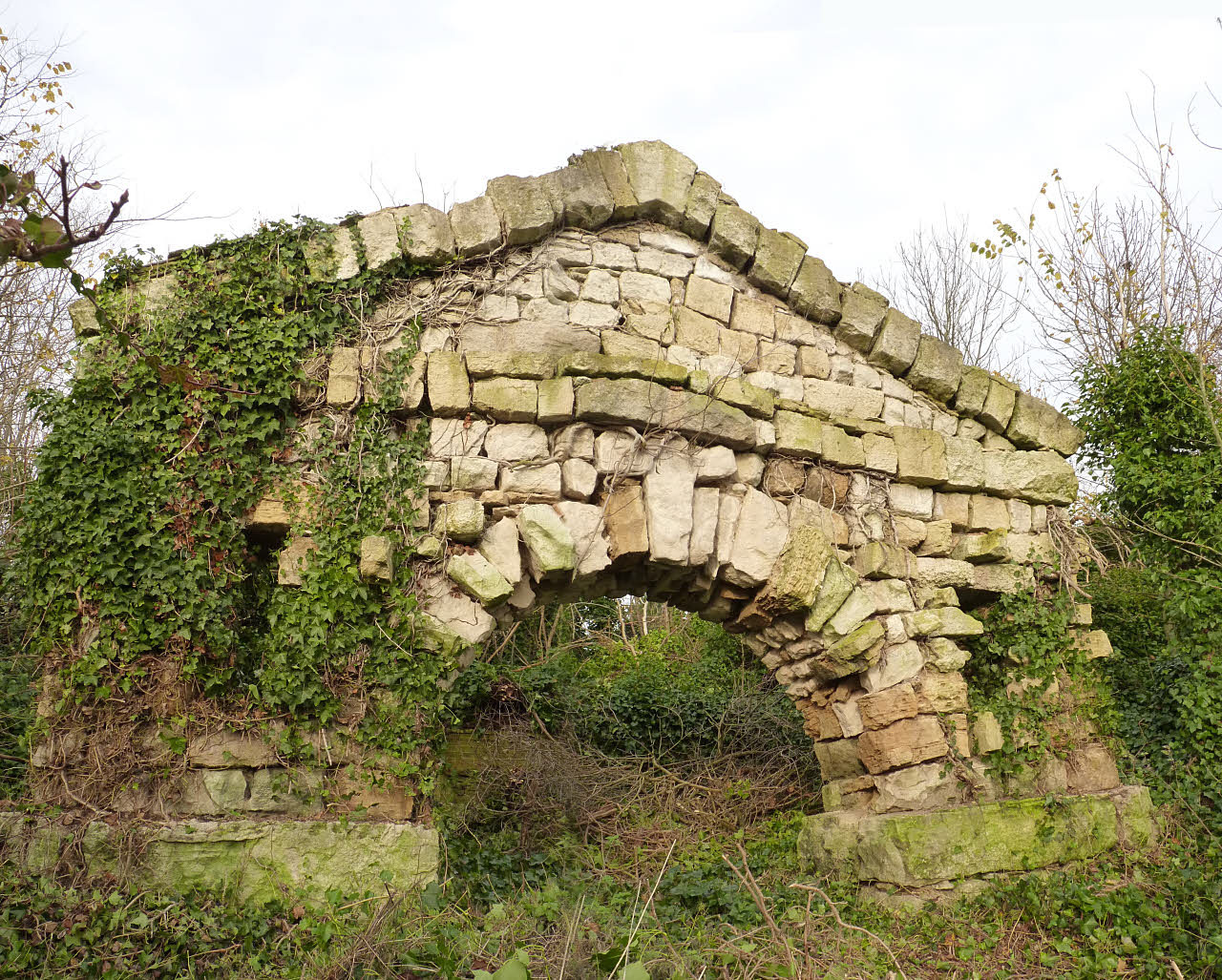
Serlby Park arch, Grade II* listed

There is a conservation area defined for Oldcotes.

=== Listed buildings and locations ===
Over 20 buildings and residences throughout the parish are listed as features of historical interest primarily in Oldcotes with two in Styrrup, including:

A Grade II* arch associated with Serlby Hall

A World War I memorial in Oldcotes

The Oldcotes churches, including the deconsecrated Wesleyan chapel

An ancient Roman villa site in Oldcotes is registered as a scheduled monument.

== Transport ==
The A1(M) trunk route runs through the parish.

The A60, A614, A634 and B6463 are other key routes in the area.

== External sites ==
- YouTube video - parish visit journal
