= Listed buildings in Styrrup with Oldcotes =

Styrrup with Oldcotes is a civil parish in the Bassetlaw District of Nottinghamshire, England. The parish contains 22 listed buildings that are recorded in the National Heritage List for England. Of these, one is listed at Grade II*, the middle of the three grades, and the others are at Grade II, the lowest grade. The parish contains the villages of Oldcotes and Styrrup, and the surrounding countryside, including part of Serlby Park, the grounds of Serlby Hall. The listed buildings in Serlby Park include two bridges, an arch, a former laundry, and lodges. In the villages, the listed buildings include houses, cottage and associated structures, farmhouses and farm buildings, two churches and a chapel, a watermill and a war memorial.

== Key ==
Grade	Criteria
II*	Particularly important buildings of more than special interest
II	Buildings of national importance and special interest

== Buildings ==
Name and location	Photograph	Date	Notes	Grade
Yews Farmhouse; 53.40811°N 1.08779°W		16th century	The farmhouse has a timber framed core, it was refronted in the late 18th century in red brick on a stone plinth, and it has a pantile roof. There are two storeys and three bays. In the centre is a doorway with a moulded wooden surround, to its top right is a small fixed light with a pointed head, between them is a wooden post, and the windows are sashes. To the left is a single-storey single-bay stone extension, and at the rear are horizontally-sliding sash windows.	II
Rose Farm Cottage; 53.39082°N 1.11120°W		Early 18th century	The cottage is in stone, with quoins, and a pantile roof with stone coped gables and kneelers. There are two storeys, three bays, and a rear lean-to. The central doorway has an architrave, a keystone, a frieze and a cornice. Above the doorway is a round-arched fixed light with moulded imposts, and the other windows are casements.	II
Arch, Serlby Park; 53.40173°N 1.04836°W		Early 18th century	The arch in the grounds of Serlby Hall is in stone and brick on a plinth. The arch has a keystone, and above it is a band and a pediment. On each side are two small rough rectangular openings, and on the north side are two brick buttressing walls.	II*
Earl's House; 53.39006°N 1.11366°W	—	Mid 18th century	The house is rendered, with stone dressings, chamfered quoins, and a pantile roof with stone coped gables and kneelers. There are two storeys and an L-shaped plan, with a main range of three bays, and a single-storey two-bay extension. The doorway is at the rear and has a rusticated surround and a hood. To its right is a bow window, and the other windows are a mix of sashes and casements.	II
The Old Hall; 53.39201°N 1.11832°W		Mid 18th century	The house is in painted stone, with the attic of the left gable rendered. It has a pantile roof with stone coped gables and kneelers. There are two storeys and attics, four bays, and a rear lean-to. The windows are casements with painted stone surrounds.	II
Bull Farmhouse; 53.39005°N 1.11449°W	—	Late 18th century	A stone cottage that has a pantile roof with stone coped gables and kneelers. There are two storeys and an L-shaped plan, with a front range of three bays. The doorway is in the centre, and the windows are casements.	II
Laundry Cottage; 53.39982°N 1.03780°W		Late 18th century	The laundry in the grounds of Serlby Hall, later a private house, is in red brick with some stone, dentilled eaves and a hipped pantile roof. There are two storeys and an L-shaped plan, with two bays, a projecting two-storey single-bay wing on the right, a recessed lean-to on the left, and at the rear is a single-storey extension. The windows are a mix of casements, and horizontally-sliding sashes.	II
Oldcotes Mill; 53.38901°N 1.10720°W	—	Late 18th century	The watermill is in stone with hipped pantile roofs. The north wing has three storeys and three bays, and the later south wing has two storeys and four bays. The water wheel is in situ, and the openings have flush stone surrounds.	II
Bawtry Lodge; 53.40973°N 1.04453°W	—	Early 19th century	The lodge at the entrance to the grounds of Serlby Hall is in stone, on a plinth, with projecting eaves and a hipped slate roof. There is a single storey and three bays, with the south front canted. The windows are casements.	II
Harworth Lodge; 53.40421°N 1.05203°W		Early 19th century	The lodge at the entrance to the grounds of Serlby Hall is in stone, on a plinth, with projecting eaves and a hipped slate roof. There is a single storey and four bays, with the south front canted. The windows are casements.	II
Ivy House Farmhouse; 53.40803°N 1.08796°W	—	Early 19th century	The farmhouse, containing earlier material, is in painted brick, with stone on the ground floor of the gable end facing the road, on a stone plinth, with a floor band, dog tooth eaves and a pantile roof. There are two storeys, a double depth plan, a main range of three bays, and a recessed two-storey single-bay wing on the right, with a single-storey extension. The doorway has a fanlight, and most of the windows are sashes, those in the ground floor with segmental heads.	II
Bridge over River Ryton (east); 53.39981°N 1.04014°W		1832	The bridge carries a road over the River Ryton in the grounds of Serlby Hall. It is in stone, and consists of a single arch with a keystone and a band. The parapets are set on a plinth on the road side, and have moulded coping, and round terminal piers. At the north, the parapets curve outwards before terminating in the piers.	II
Bridge over River Ryton (west); 53.40075°N 1.04559°W	—	c. 1832	The bridge carries a road over the River Ryton in the grounds of Serlby Hall. It is in stone, with some brick on the underside of the arch, and consists of a single arch with a keystone and a band. The parapets are set on a plinth, and have moulded coping, and round terminal piers.	II
Wesleyan Chapel; 53.39079°N 1.11280°W		1840	The chapel is rendered, on a plinth, and has a hipped slate roof with an iron vent. In the centre is a gabled porch with a bargeboard, containing a double door with a semicircular fanlight, above which is an inscribed and dated plaque. The windows are round-headed casements.	II
East Lodge; 53.39041°N 1.10946°W		c. 1855	The lodge is in red brick on a brick plinth, with blue brick diapering, bands, stone dressings and a hipped slate roof. There is a single storey with an attic, and a single bay. On the front is a canted bay window with casements and decorated columns, and above is a gabled half-dormer with a bargeboard. To the right and recessed is a two-storey turret with a shaped pyramidal roof. It has dog tooth eaves over a Lombard frieze. At the rear is a doorway with decorated imposts, above which is an arch with blue brick and stone infill, and over that is a stone carved with a coat of arms.	II
Manor Farm Farmhouse; 53.39093°N 1.11007°W		1855	The farmhouse is in red brick on a plinth, with a chamfered stone course above, dressings in blue brick and stone, quoins, a floor band, and a slate roof with stone coped gables and a decorated ridge. There are two storeys and attics, and five bays, the left two bays under a gable. To the left is a recessed two-storey three-bay wing, and at the rear are two two-storey wings. In the centre is a gabled porch containing an arched window on the front and arched doorways on the sides, and a doorway with a fanlight. The windows are sashes with mullions or mullions and transoms, quoined surrounds and keystones, each in a relieving arch of red and blue brick.	II
Farm buildings, Manor Farm; 53.39131°N 1.10959°W		c. 1855	The farm buildings are in red brick with stone dressings, they have slate roofs with stone coped gables, and include a range of two storeys and eleven bays. Projecting from the right is a two-storey barn, and projecting from this is a single-storey 15-bay range extending along the road, including a three-storey pigeoncote. The openings include doorways and casement windows, some with mullions and transoms. The pigeoncote has a hipped roof, surmounted by a large glover containing a band of blind arcading with pigeon openings, and a hipped roof with an iron ridge and weathervane.	II
Garden wall, Manor Farmhouse; 53.39060°N 1.10995°W		c. 1855	The wall is in red brick, with triangular stone coping and decorative cast iron railings. At the southwest it rises to meet a pair of stone piers with shaped coping and a decorative iron gate, and there are similar piers and a gate at the northeast. The wall extends for 60 metres (200 ft) along the south of the garden and 20 metres (66 ft) on the east front.	II
Outbuilding, Manor Farm; 53.39102°N 1.10973°W		c. 1855	The outbuilding is in red brick with stone dressings, and a slate roof with stone coped gables. There is a single storey and five bays, and it contains doorways and windows, most with quoin jambs. To the right is a lower single-bay extension with an eaves band and a vent.	II
St Helen's Church; 53.39040°N 1.11283°W		1868–69	The church is in stone and has a tile roof with decorated ridges. It consists of a nave, a south porch, a chancel, a north vestry and organ chamber, and a northeast bell turret. At the west end is a four-light arched window, and the east window has five lights.	II
St Mark's Church; 53.39162°N 1.11859°W		c. 1900	The church, designed by C. Hodgson Fowler, is timber framed with plaster infill, on a red brick plinth with stone quoins, and it has a tile roof with bargeboards and overhanging eaves on wooden brackets. The church consists of a nave and a chancel under a single roof, with a north porch and a north vestry. The windows have wooden surround and mullions.	II
Oldcotes War Memorial; 53.39161°N 1.11844°W		1920	The war memorial in the churchyard of St Mark's Church, to the east of the church, is in grey granite. It consists of a broken column with carvings of a sheathed sword and a wreath in relief. The column stands on a tapering rusticated plinth on a base of three steps. On the front of the plinth is an inscription and the names of these lost in the First World War, and on the second step is a flower-holder in memory of a later casualty.	II
