= Hermeston Hall =

Coordinates: 53°23′19″N 1°6′56″W

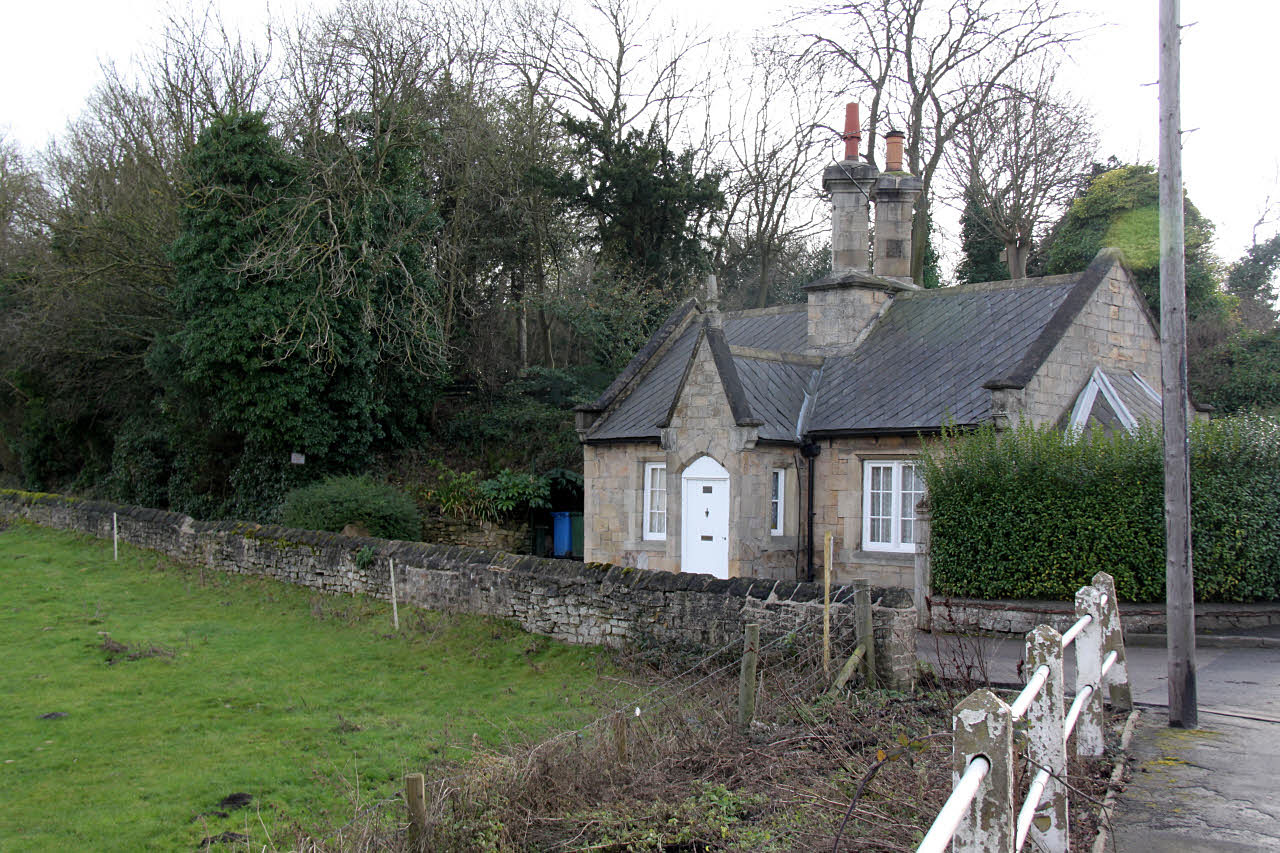
East Lodge on the Hermeston Hall estate

Hermeston Hall is a manor house near to the villages of Oldcotes and Langold, and within the parish or Hodsock, northwestern Nottinghamshire, England. It is located in a lane just off the A60 road, just south of the village of Oldcotes on the road to Langold.

== History ==
Hermeston Hall is situated on a site where a previous manor stood, built around 1100 AD for the Cress family who lived there until 1408. Bess of Hardwick was known to have been connected to the property in the 16th century. Bess of Hardwick's house "Oldcotes" or "Owlcotes", where Arbella Stuart stayed in 1603, was at Sutton Scarsdale.

Foundations of the earlier house have been found under the floor. The site, however is believed to date back much further, given a Roman road runs through the land and a Roman villa was once situated in the vicinity of the house. After the English Civil War the property fell into decline and from 1765 the area fell under the ownership of the Mellish family who owned some 20,000 acres (81 km^{2}) of local land.

The hall as it stands today was created in 1848 by Edward Challoner, a timber importer from Old Swan, Liverpool, who bought the house and some adjacent farmland and added a new south wing. It actually contains part of an older 16th century abbey on the rear side which was owned by the Riddell family.

Edward Challoner left three daughters, one of whom, Catherine Flora, inherited the house and married Edward Charles Riddell. They added another two wings to create the square shape the house has today, with some 50 rooms.

At one stage it was being marketed as a hotel but is now residential.
