= Hodsock =

Village and civil parish in Nottinghamshire, England

Coordinates: 53.361°N 1.0816°W

- Civil parish
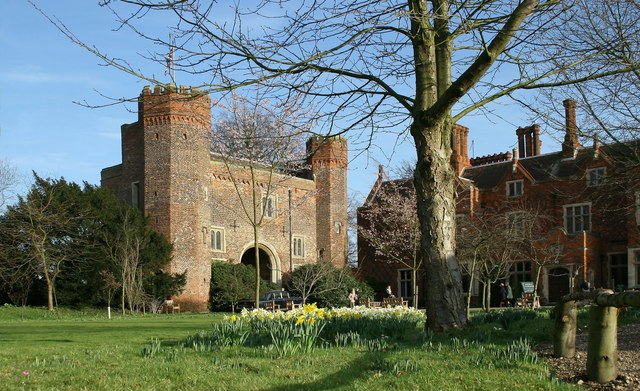
- Hodsock Priory

- Location within Nottinghamshire
- Interactive map of Hodsock
- Area: 16.5 km^{2} (6.4 sq mi)
- Population: 2,603 (2021)
  - Density: 158/km^{2} (410/sq mi)
- OS grid reference: SK587872
  - London: 130 mi (210 km) SE
- District: Bassetlaw
- Shire county: Nottinghamshire
- Region: East Midlands
- Country: England
- Sovereign state: United Kingdom
- Settlements: Hodsock Priory: Langold
- Post town: WORKSOP
- Postcode district: S81
- Dialling code: 01909
- Police: Nottinghamshire
- Fire: Nottinghamshire
- Ambulance: East Midlands
- UK Parliament: Bassetlaw
- Website: www.hodsockparishcouncil.org.uk

Hodsock is a village and civil parish about 4 miles from Worksop, in the Bassetlaw district, in the county of Nottinghamshire, England. The parish includes the village of Langold and the country house Hodsock Priory. In 2021 the parish had a population of 2,603. The parish is surrounded by the settlements of Babworth, Barnby Moor, Blyth, Carlton in Lindrick, Costhorpe, Firbeck, Letwell, Maltby, Styrrup with Oldcotes and Torworth.

== Toponymy ==
The name "Hodsock" means 'Hod's oak-tree'.

== Geography ==
The area is 4 miles north east of Worksop, and 30 miles north of Nottingham.

The parish consists of two settlements:

- Hodsock, a hamlet which is at the centre of the parish;
- Langold, which is a village. This is located to the north west, and is 2 miles from Hodsock.

A deserted village, Hermeston possibly existed locally, but the exact location remains unknown.

The border by Langold is shared with the county of South Yorkshire and Rotherham borough.

Three classified routes pass through the area:

- The A1 cross-country trunk route forms the lower right border;
- The A60 Worksop-Doncaster road separates the communities of Langold and Hodsock;
- The B6045 secondary road linking Blyth and Worksop. Hodsock village is primarily accessed from this road.

Predominantly, the parish is a scattering of farms, farmhouses and cottages amongst a wider rural setting. The area around Langold is more built up in character. The River Ryton forms part of the east border of the parish, the Oldcotes Dyke is the northern border and drains into the Ryton.

Forested areas are mainly to the south of Hodsock, but some surround Langold including Langold Country Park.

The parish is very low-lying, averaging 20 metres (66 ft), with the highest points just north of Langold at 52 metres (171 ft) and by the B6045 road with the southern parish boundary at 48–50 metres (157–164 ft).

== Communities ==
=== Hodsock village ===
The historic centre of the area is Hodsock Priory, which is an landed country house and estate. Despite its name, it is not and never has been a priory. Hodsock was recorded in the Domesday Book as Odesach. Hodsock was formerly a lordship in the parish of Blyth, in 1866 Hodsock became a civil parish in its own right. The Priory and gardens is at the centre of the 800-acre (3.2 km^{2}) estate, owned by the Mellish and Buchanan families since 1765. The farm is 700 acres (2.8 km^{2}) and grows carrots, wheat, barley and sugar beet. There is 100 acres (0.40 km^{2}) of managed woodland.

=== Langold ===
Langold village was built to provide housing for the miners of Firbeck Colliery. Before the early twentieth century it consisted of farmland and parkland in the estates of Firbeck and Hodsock. Hodsock Priory and estate with its farms, and much of Carlton-in-Lindrick were bought by the Mellish family in 1765, parts of which they sold on to Ralph Knight of Langold. Much of what was Knight's Langold estate remains within South Yorkshire presently. By 1911, mining in the area suggested that there may be a workable seam of coal at Langold. The Wallingwells Boring Company was created, but the First World War brought a stop to the work. Sinking of the first colliery shaft began in 1923. Construction of housing began to the west of the main road in 1924, and completed in 1927. The mine closed on 31 December 1968.

=== Hermeston ===
The parish possibly included the deserted medieval village of Hermeston. Though its location is not known nor is it known if it was one, it was referred to in historical texts, and was likely to be close to (and possibly north of) present day Hermeston Hall.

== Governance ==
Hodsock Parish Council administer the first layer of public services.

Bassetlaw District Council administer the next tier of services, with Nottinghamshire County Council actioning the highest level of local public duties.

== Landmarks ==
There are 13 listed buildings in Hodsock, including the Priory and Langold War Memorial.
