= St Mark's Church, Oldcotes =

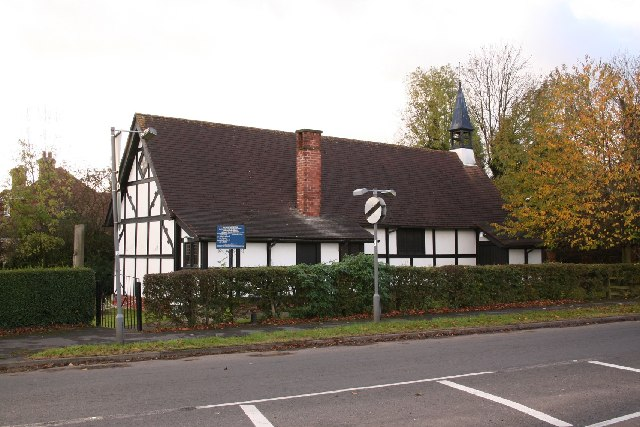
- St Mark's Church, Oldcotes
- St Mark's Church, Oldcotes
- 53°23′29″N 1°7′5″W
- OS grid reference: SK 58714 88669
- Location: Oldcotes
- Country: England
- Denomination: Church of England

Architecture
- Architect: Charles Hodgson Fowler
- Completed: 1900

Administration
- Diocese: Diocese of Southwell and Nottingham
- Archdeaconry: Newark
- Deanery: Bassetlaw and Bawtry

St Mark's Church, Oldcotes is a Grade II listed parish church in the Church of England in Oldcotes.

== History ==
The church was built around 1900 by Charles Hodgson Fowler in half brick and half timber construction. The brickwork has now been rendered white. Parish church, c.1900. C. Hodgson Fowler. Red brick, ashlar, timber frame with plaster infill. Tiled roof, the eaves overhang supported on wooden brackets, with single red brick stack to the north east and bellcote to the west. Barge boards. Set on a red brick plinth with ashlar quoins. Chancel and nave under single roof, north porch and north vestry. West end has a single window with 4 arched lights, above is a single, similar 2 light window. In the apex is a single lozenge shaped window. The west porch has a single 2 light window and the east a doorway with double wooden door. North wall with single window with 3 arched lights. West vestry wall has doorway with wooden door, north wall has a single 2 light window and doorway with wooden door to its left and east wall has a single 2 light window. East chancel, with some ornamental panelling, has a single quatrefoil light in the apex. South front has 2 windows with 2 arched lights and, to the left, 4 windows with 3 arched lights. All windows in wooden surrounds, with wooden mullions, lead glazing bars and under flat arches. Interior has canopy over altar and decorative roof truss. Included for group value only.

It is part of a joint parish with:

- St John the Evangelist's Church, Carlton in Lindrick
- St Luke's Church, Langold

== See also ==
- Listed buildings in Styrrup with Oldcotes
