= Styrrup =

Village in Nottinghamshire, England

Coordinates: 53.4086°N 1.0870°W

- Village
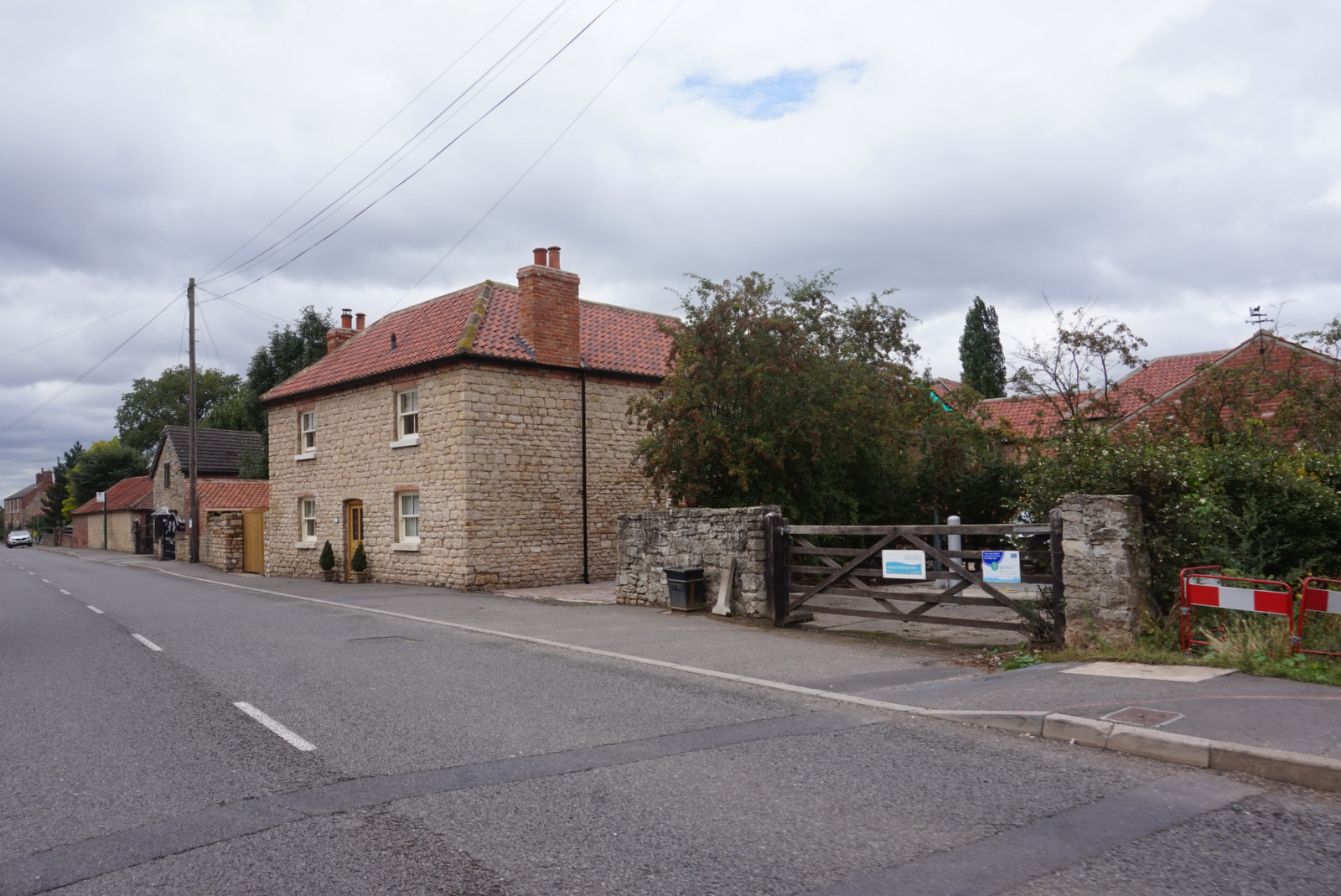
- Main Street

- Location within Nottinghamshire
- Population: 731 (2021 census - parish)
- Civil parish: Styrrup with Oldcotes
- District: Bassetlaw
- Shire county: Nottinghamshire
- Region: East Midlands
- Country: England
- Sovereign state: United Kingdom
- Post town: Doncaster
- Postcode district: DN11
- Police: Nottinghamshire
- Fire: Nottinghamshire
- Ambulance: East Midlands
- UK Parliament: Bassetlaw

Styrrup is a village in the civil parish of Styrrup with Oldcotes on the B6463 road in the Bassetlaw district, in the English county of Nottinghamshire. The population of the civil parish at the 2021 census was 731, an increase from the 685 of 2011. It is near the small town of Harworth. The village is surrounded by farmland and is approximately 1 mile from the A1 road intersection at Blyth. The housing consists primarily of modern properties constructed in the 1970s and numerous barn conversions arranged off the Main Street. The local pub, The White Swan, has been demolished and replaced by modern housing.

== Etymology ==
In the Domesday survey it is mentioned as Estirapc - Eastern rape - as it lies on the borders east of the west riding of York.

== See also ==
- Listed buildings in Styrrup with Oldcotes
