= Oldcotes =

Coordinates: 53.3912392°N 1.1172333°W

- Location within Nottinghamshire
- OS grid reference: SK584871
- Civil parish: Styrrup with Oldcotes
- District: Bassetlaw
- Shire county: Nottinghamshire
- Region: East Midlands
- Country: England
- Sovereign state: United Kingdom
- Post town: Worksop
- Postcode district: S81
- Dialling code: 01909
- Police: Nottinghamshire
- Fire: Nottinghamshire
- Ambulance: East Midlands
- UK Parliament: Bassetlaw

Oldcotes is a village in Nottinghamshire, England. It is in the civil parish of Styrrup with Oldcotes (where the population is shown). The village is centred on the crossroads of the A60 and A634 roads, five miles south east of Maltby.

The history of the village is long and varied. The earliest proof of occupation was the Roman Villa located under the church.

The main focus of the village centres on the Village Hall on Maltby Road, with a history society, bingo, bowls and dancing clubs. There is one public house in the village called the King William.

Hermeston Hall is located just to the south of the village.

== Population ==
The parish Styrrup with Oldcotes had a population of 708 in 2024.

== Buildings ==
Oldcotes Dyke runs along the southern edge of the village, and has supplied the power to drive two water mills, both of which produced flour. Goldthorpe Mill is situated to the west of the A60 Worksop to Tickhill road. It is an early 18th-century building, with later additions, and has been converted into a house. It still contains a steel water wheel dating from the late 19th century, and parts of the wooden machinery. Oldcotes Mill is to the east of the village. This dates from the late 18th and early 19th centuries. The wheel drove 3 sets of stones, and much of the machinery is still in situ. It is inscribed "John Thornton Millwright Engineer & C Worksop".

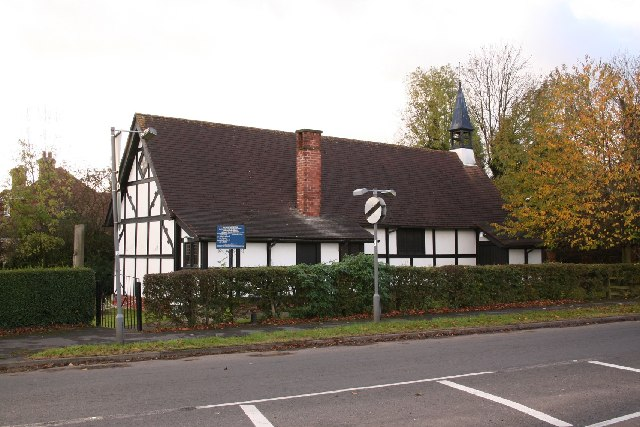
St Mark's church

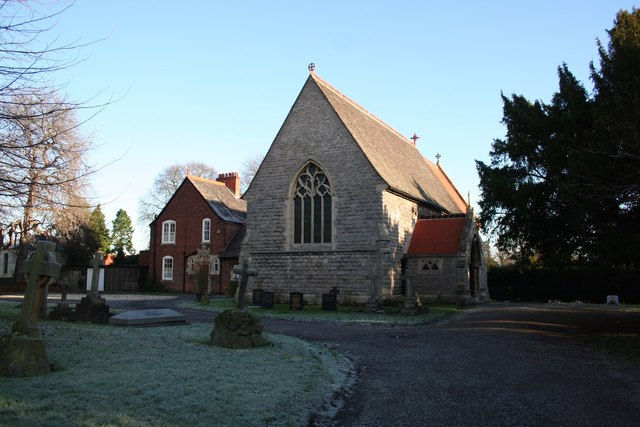
St Helen's church

The parish church is dedicated to St Mark, and is situated to the south-west of the crossroads. It was built in 1900 to a design by C Hodgson Fowler. It has a red brick plinth, but the main structure is timber framed, with plaster infill. There is a bell cote at the west end, and the structure is Grade II listed. The nearby war memorial was designed by A H Borrowdale of Worksop, and was unveiled on 18 July 1920 by Colonel H Mellish, of Hodsock Priory. Revd F d’Arblay Burney from Harworth conducted a dedication ceremony on the occasion. On the north side of the A634 is The Old Hall, a mid-18th-century house with 20th-century modifications.

At the western end of Main Street is the Roman Catholic Church of St Helen. It was built between 1869 and 1871, and is thought to have been designed by S J Nicholl. It is constructed of ashlar masonry, is set on a plinth, and has a decorative bell turret. To the north of it, on Blyth Road, is a Wesleyan Chapel dating from 1840. It is built on a plinth, and the walls are rendered. It contained the original furniture when it was added to the listed building register in 1985, but has since been converted into a house.

== See also ==
- Listed buildings in Styrrup with Oldcotes
