= Listed buildings in Carlton in Lindrick =

Carlton in Lindrick is a civil parish in the Bassetlaw District of Nottinghamshire, England. The parish contains 39 listed buildings that are recorded in the National Heritage List for England. Of these, one is listed at Grade I, the highest of the three grades, and the others are at Grade II, the lowest grade. The parish contains the villages of Carlton in Lindrick and Wigthorpe and the surrounding area. Most of the listed buildings are houses, cottages and associated structures, farmhouses and farm buildings. The other listed buildings include a church and memorials in the churchyard, a former watermill and associated structures, a former toll house, schools, a bridge and a war memorial.

== Key ==
Grade	Criteria
I	Buildings of exceptional interest, sometimes considered to be internationally important
II	Buildings of national importance and special interest

== Buildings ==
Name and location	Photograph	Date	Notes	Grade
St John the Evangelist's Church; 53.34876°N 1.11774°W		11th century	The church has been altered and extended through the centuries, including additions made in 1832–33, and a restoration by C. Hodgson Fowler in 1892. It is built in stone and consists of a nave with a clerestory, north and south aisles, a chancel, a north chapel, a south vestry, and a west tower. The tower has four stages, two string courses, and an embattled parapet with eight crocketed pinnacles and four central gargoyles. On the west side is a Norman doorway, moved from the south side. This has three orders, with volute capitals and decorated voussoirs. Above are three-light bell openings and clock faces. There are embattled parapets and pinnacles along the aisles and the chancel, and the east window has five lights.	I
The Old Rectory; 53.34835°N 1.11805°W		17th century	The rectory, later a house and a cottage, is in stone on a plinth, with quoins, and a pantile roof with coped gables and kneelers. The entrance front has two storeys and attics, and three bays, the outer bays gabled, and the middle bay with a parapet. The central doorway has a depressed arch, a modillion cornice and a shaped hood. To its right is a bay window, the other windows in the lower two floors are sashes, and in the attics they are casements. The east front has two storeys and five bays, and a central pediment.	II
The Bridge View and outbuilding 53.34835°N 1.11805°W	—	Early 18th century	A cottage in rendered stone with a pantile roof. There are two storeys, three bays, and a rear lean-to. The doorway is in the centre, and the windows are horizontally-sliding sashes. Attached on the left is a single-storey outbuilding with a curved corner.	II
The Cottage; 53.35548°N 1.11097°W	—	Early 18th century	A cottage, formerly a public house, in stone with a pantile roof. There is a single storey and an attic, two bays, and a rear lean-to. It contains a doorway, a fixed light, a casement window, and two horizontally-sliding sash windows.	II
Wigthorpe Hall; 53.34483°N 1.11078°W		Early 18th century	A country house that was extended in 1872. It is in stone, with some red brick, on a plinth, with chamfered quoins, floor bands, a cornice and a blocking course, and a slate roof. The earlier part has two storeys and attics, and three bays. In the centre is a doorway with a quoined surround, a keystone and a pediment. The outer bays contain full height bow windows, and the other windows are sashes. The later wing to the right has two storeys and three bays, and contains a canted bay window. To the right and recessed is a two-story three-bay wing, and to the left is a wing with two storeys and four bays.	II
Clover Cottage; 53.35446°N 1.10949°W		Mid 18th century	Two cottages combined into one house, it is in stone with pantile roofs. The earlier cottage on the right has a stone coped gable on the right, two storeys and three bays. In the centre is a gabled porch, and the windows are casements. The left cottage, dating from the late 18th century, is higher, and has two storeys and three bays. In the centre is a blocked doorway with an inserted fixed light. The other windows are horizontally-sliding sashes, those in the ground floor with splayed lintels and keystones.	II
Lavin's Cottage and outbuilding 53.34758°N 1.11694°W		Mid 18th century	The cottage, at one time a public house, and the attached outbuilding, are in stone with a pantile roof, and the gable end faces the road. There are two storeys and nine bays. Most of the windows are horizontally-sliding sashes, there is one casement window, and also on the front are doorways and slit vents.	II
Wigthorpe House; 53.34291°N 1.11308°W	—	Mid 18th century	The house, which was later extended, is in stone with some rendering, on a plinth, with quoins, and a slate roof with a coped left gable and kneelers. There are two storeys, and an L-shaped plan, with a front range of five bays, and a later projecting five-bay wing. The house contains a two-storey canted bay window, and a French window, and most of the other windows are sashes.	II
4 High Road, South Carlton; 53.34704°N 1.11457°W	—	Late 18th century	A stone cottage with a wooden dentilled eaves band, a decorative fascia, and a slate roof with a stone coped gable on the left. There are two storeys, three bays, a central doorway and sash windows.	II
6 High Road, South Carlton; 53.34731°N 1.11457°W	—	Late 18th century	The house is in stone with a hipped pantile roof. There are two storeys and the front facing the road has three bays. In the centre is a doorway, and the windows are casements.	II
Carlton Mill; 53.34782°N 1.11870°W		Late 18th century	A former corn watermill that was extended in the 19th century, it is in stone with a pantile roof. There are two storeys and attics, two main bays, and a lower recessed bay to the right. The two main bays have gables with bargeboards, and the left bay contains an arch with a keystone and a recessed doorway. The windows are casements, those in the upper floor and attics with segmental heads. The recessed bay has a hipped roof, quoins, and an arch with a keystone containing a cast iron waterwheel. Above are horizontally-sliding sash windows, the lower one with a segmental head.	II
Cottage Farm Farmhouse; 53.35512°N 1.10618°W	—	Late 18th century	A cottage in rendered stone with a pantile roof, it has a single storey and attics, and a rear lean-to. In the left gable is a doorway, the right gable has three ledges, and the windows are sashes.	II
Ivy Mount; 53.34664°N 1.11414°W	—	Late 18th century	A stone house on a shallow plinth with a pantile roof. There are two storeys, a front of three bays, and single and two-storey rear extensions. In the centre is a gabled porch, and the windows are sashes, those in the upper floor are horizontally-sliding.	II
Kitchen Garden Wall; 53.35170°N 1.12291°W	—	Late 18th century	The wall enclosing the kitchen garden of Carlton Hall, which has been demolished, was designed by William Emes. It is a semicircular wall facing south in red brick, with copings and buttresses on the north side in magnesium limestone. The central section is recessed, and lean-to bothies are attached to the north. The wall is about 5 metres (16 ft) high and over 200 metres (660 ft) long.	II
Low Cottage and outbuilding 53.35336°N 1.11179°W	—	Late 18th century	The cottage is in painted brick with dogtooth eaves and a pantile roof. There is a single storey and attics, and an L-shaped plan, with a front of three bays, a rear wing, and a garage extension on the left. In the centre is a doorway, the windows on the front are sashes, and elsewhere are horizontally-sliding sashes. Attached on the left is an outbuilding in stone with some brick, and with a lean-to.	II
Low Field Farmhouse; 53.34722°N 1.11790°W	—	Late 18th century	The farmhouse is in stone on a plinth, with a floor band and a hipped pantile roof. There are two storeys and attics, and an L-shaped plan, with a front of three bays, and a rear wing. The doorway is in the centre, the lower floors contain sash windows and in the top floor are casements. All the openings have splayed lintels and projecting keystones, and in the rear wing is an arched stair window.	II
Stable, Low Field Farm; 53.34725°N 1.11769°W	—	Late 18th century	A cottage, later a stable, in stone with a hipped pantile roof. There are two storeys and three bays. The doorway and windows have flush splayed lintels, and slightly projecting keystones.	II
North House and Copper Beeches; 53.35685°N 1.11200°W	—	Late 18th century	A house, later divided into three, it is in stone on a plinth, partly rendered, with quoins, a modillion cornice, and slate roofs with stone coped gables and kneelers. There are two storeys, and a U-shaped plan, with a south front of five bays and a west front of seven bays. Most of the windows are sashes, there are bay windows, and a round-headed fixed window.	II
School House; 53.35173°N 1.11414°W		Late 18th century	A pair of cottages with pantile roofs, stone coped gables and kneelers. There are two storeys and four bays, and at the rear of No. 72 is a single-bay wing. On the front are doorways with cornices, and a mix of sash and casement windows.	II
South View; 53.34644°N 1.11391°W	—	Late 18th century	A house in red brick, with a floor band, an eaves band and a pantile roof. There are two storeys and four bays, flanking lean-tos, and rear extensions. The doorway has an architrave, a traceried fanlight and a pediment. To its left is a bay window with a slate roof, and the other windows are horizontally-sliding sashes with splayed brick lintels and keystones.	II
Archway, Wigthorpe Hall; 53.34448°N 1.11113°W	—	Late 18th century	A monumental gateway moved from Carlton Hall after it was demolished in 1955. It is in stone and consists of three arches. The middle arch projects under a pediment, and has a moulded surround and imposts. The outer arches have imposts and moulded cornices.	II
Bridge Farm House; 53.35394°N 1.11037°W	—	c. 1800	The farmhouse is in stone on a plinth, and has a pantile roof with stone coped gables and kneelers. There are two storeys, and an L-shaped plan, with a front of three bays, and a lower single-bay rear wing. In the centre is a doorway with a fanlight and a hood on brackets. Above it is a sash window, the other windows are casements, and all the windows have splayed lintels.	II
Memorial south of the church 53.34861°N 1.11761°W	—	c. 1800	The memorial is in the churchyard of St John the Evangelist's Church, to the south of the chancel. It is in stone and consists of an obelisk on a square base. On the base are carvings, including a cherub, and at the top of the obelisk are roundels. The inscription is illegible.	II
Wright's House; 53.35500°N 1.11074°W		c. 1800	The house is in stone, and has a pantile roof with coped gables and kneelers. There are two storeys and attics, and three bays. In the centre is a doorway, the windows are casements, and all the openings have painted lintels.	II
1–7 Church Lane, South Carlton; 53.34763°N 1.11730°W		Early 19th century	A row of seven cottages in stone with a pantile roof. There are two storeys and 17 bays. The middle three bays project slightly under a coped pediment and contain a central archway on impost blocks, above which is a round-headed window. The windows are horizontally-sliding sashes, and the ground floor windows and doorways have splayed lintels and keystones.	II
1 High Road, South Carlton; 53.34728°N 1.11493°W		Early 19th century	A former toll house in stone, on a plinth, with a pantile roof. There are two storeys and a hexagonal plan. In the centre is a round-headed doorway with a traceried fanlight and a projecting keystone. Above it is a casement window, the ground floor windows are horizontally-sliding sashes, and all the windows have splayed lintels and projecting keystones.	II
3 High Road and barn, South Carlton; 53.34738°N 1.11496°W		Early 19th century	A stone cottage, at one time an inn, on a plinth, with a pantile roof. There are two storeys and three bays. In the centre is a doorway with a quoined surround, a semicircular fanlight, imposts and a keystone. The windows are sashes, those in the upper floor are horizontally-sliding, and they all have splayed lintels and keystones. Projecting on the right is a lower two-storey barn, containing a central arched doorway and openings with wooden slats above.	II
1–7 Low Street, North Carlton; 53.35279°N 1.11217°W	—	Early 19th century	A row of seven cottages in stone with a pantile roof. There are two storeys and 14 bays. The windows are horizontally-sliding sashes.	II
Broom Farmhouse, wall and outbuilding 53.33858°N 1.11841°W	—	Early 19th century	The farmhouse is in stone on a plinth, and has a pantile roof with stone coped gables. There are two storeys and attics, three bays, and a lean-to extension on the left. In the centre is a doorway, the windows are sashes, and in the attics are Diocletian windows with casements. Attached to the lean-to is a stone wall containing a doorway, and ending in a stone outbuilding with a single storey and two bays, containing a doorway and a horizontally-sliding sash window.	II
Hodsock House; 53.35714°N 1.10821°W	—	Early 19th century	A red brick house with dogtooth eaves and a pantile roof. There are two storeys, three bays and rear extensions. In the centre is a doorway, above it is a fixed window, the other windows are horizontally-sliding sashes, and all the openings have segmental heads.	II
Infant School; 53.35186°N 1.11399°W		Early 19th century	The school is in stone with some brick, and has a hipped pantile roof with a central wrought iron bell lantern. There is a single storey and five bays, and a rear lean-to. The central doorway has a stone hood on brackets, and the windows are sashes.	II
Barn, pigeoncote and outbuildings, Low Field Farm; 53.34757°N 1.11802°W		Early 19th century	The buildings are in stone with pantile roofs. The barn has two storeys and a hipped roof, and openings under segmental arches. To the right is an outbuilding with one storey and a loft, and five bays, and beyond that is a two-storey pigeoncote with a pyramidal roof. Projecting from this is a single-story cartshed and outbuilding.	II
Mill Side; 53.34772°N 1.11869°W		Early 19th century	A stone cottage with a tile roof and a coped gable on the left. There are two storeys and an attic, and two bays. In the centre is a gabled porch with a bargeboard and pendant, the windows in the ground floor are sashes, and in the upper floor they are casements.	II
North House Farmhouse; 53.35753°N 1.11131°W		Early 19th century	The farmhouse is in stone with a hipped pantile roof. There are two storeys, three bays, and extensive rear additions. In the centre is a gabled porch and a doorway with a fanlight. One of the windows is a horizontally-sliding sash, and the others are casements.	II
Barn and outbuildings, North House Farm; 53.35768°N 1.11156°W	—	Early 19th century	The barn and outbuildings are in stone with pantile roofs. The barn has a blocked carriageway with an inserted window, other openings with segmental arches, and slit vents. To the left are recessed two-storey outbuildings, and projecting and further to the left another range with external steps and a stable door.	II
Carlton Mill Bridge and overshoot 53.34787°N 1.11827°W		1831	The bridge carries Church Lane over a waterway, it is in stone, and has two arches with a cutwater. To the west is a concrete footbridge over a weir with three piers on each side and iron railings. The overshoot is in stone with two steps, and rendered walls flanking the weir.	II
Junior School; 53.35196°N 1.11457°W		1831	The school is rendered, on a stone plinth, and has a projecting eaves band, and a hipped slate roof. There is a single storey and five bays. The windows are three-light casements with Gothick glazing bars. In the left gable end is a doorway with a fanlight and windows, and recessed on the right is a two-bay wing.	II
Memorial to Private George Wallace Jackson; 53.34918°N 1.11620°W	—	c.1919	The memorial is in the churchyard of St John the Evangelist's Church, to the north of the church. It is in stone, and consists of the statue of a standing infantryman, on a tall square pedestal, on a stone base. There are inscriptions to the soldier, and to his mother, on the sides of the pedestal. The memorial is enclosed by rails on four corner posts.	II
War memorial 53.35036°N 1.11529°W		1921	The war memorial is in an enclosure near a road junction. It is in Clipsham limestone, and consists of an elaborate Greek cross-head with a narrow shaft on an octagonal plinth. On the plinth are bronze plaques with inscriptions, and the names of those lost in the two World Wars.	II
