= St Luke's Church, Langold =

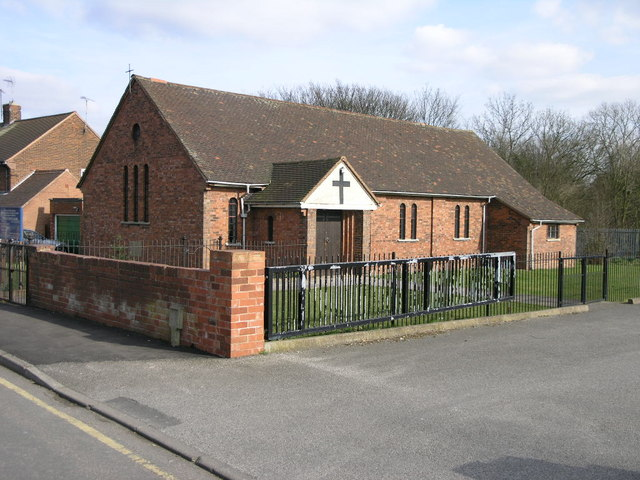
- St Luke's Church, Langold
- St Luke's Church, Langold
- 53°22′29.34″N 1°7′14.32″W
- Location: Langold
- Country: England
- Denomination: Church of England

Administration
- Diocese: Diocese of Southwell and Nottingham
- Archdeaconry: Newark
- Deanery: Bassetlaw and Bawtry

St Luke's Church, Langold is a parish church in the Church of England in Langold.

== History ==
The church was built in 1928. The foundation stone reads To the glory of God. This stone was laid by Miss Mellish 25 June 1928.

It is part of a joint parish with:

- St John the Evangelist's Church, Carlton in Lindrick
- St Mark's Church, Oldcotes
