= St John the Evangelist's Church, Carlton in Lindrick =

Parish church of Carlton in Lindrick, Nottinghamshire, England

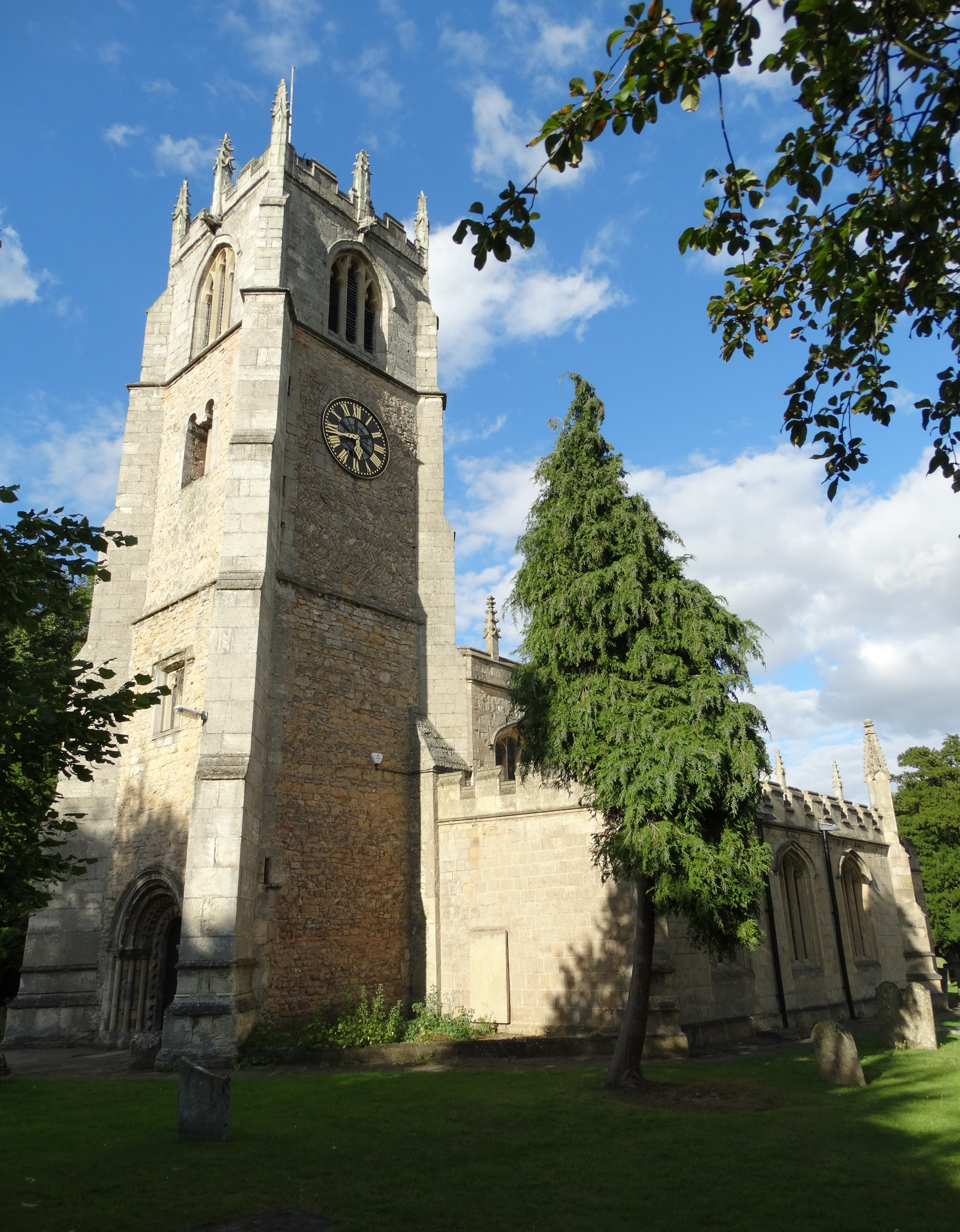
- St John the Evangelist's Church, Carlton in Lindrick
- St John the Evangelist's Church, Carlton in Lindrick
- 53°20′55.1″N 1°7′4.9″W
- OS grid reference: SK 58826 83902
- Location: Carlton in Lindrick
- Country: England
- Denomination: Church of England
- Website: stjohnscil.org.uk

Architecture
- Heritage designation: Grade I listed

Administration
- Diocese: Diocese of Southwell and Nottingham
- Archdeaconry: Newark
- Deanery: Bassetlaw and Bawtry

St John the Evangelist's Church is a Grade I listed parish church in the Church of England in Carlton in Lindrick, Nottinghamshire.

Situated in Carlton's section of South Carlton, it mustn't be confused with St John the Baptist's Church (see WM Commons) in South Carlton, Lincolnshire

== History ==
The church dates from the 7th century, making it one of the earliest religious foundations in Nottinghamshire.

The tower is from the early Norman period. The tower and chancel arches are also Norman. The north arcade is Transitional Norman and the south was built to imitate it. The church has a Norman font and an alabaster carving of the 15th century.

St Johns forms a joint parish with St Luke's Church, Langold and St Mark's Church, Oldcotes, within the Diocese of Southwell and Nottingham.

== Clock ==
An old clock which had not operated for over 20 years was replaced in 1851 with one donated by Robert Ramsden Esq. and built by Whitehurst of Derby. It comprised two dials of cast painted metal, a pendulum weighing 1.25 cwt and a driving weight of 5.25 cwt.

== See also ==
- Grade I listed buildings in Nottinghamshire
- Listed buildings in Carlton in Lindrick
