= Hodsock Priory =

Grade II listed country house in Nottinghamshire, United Kingdom

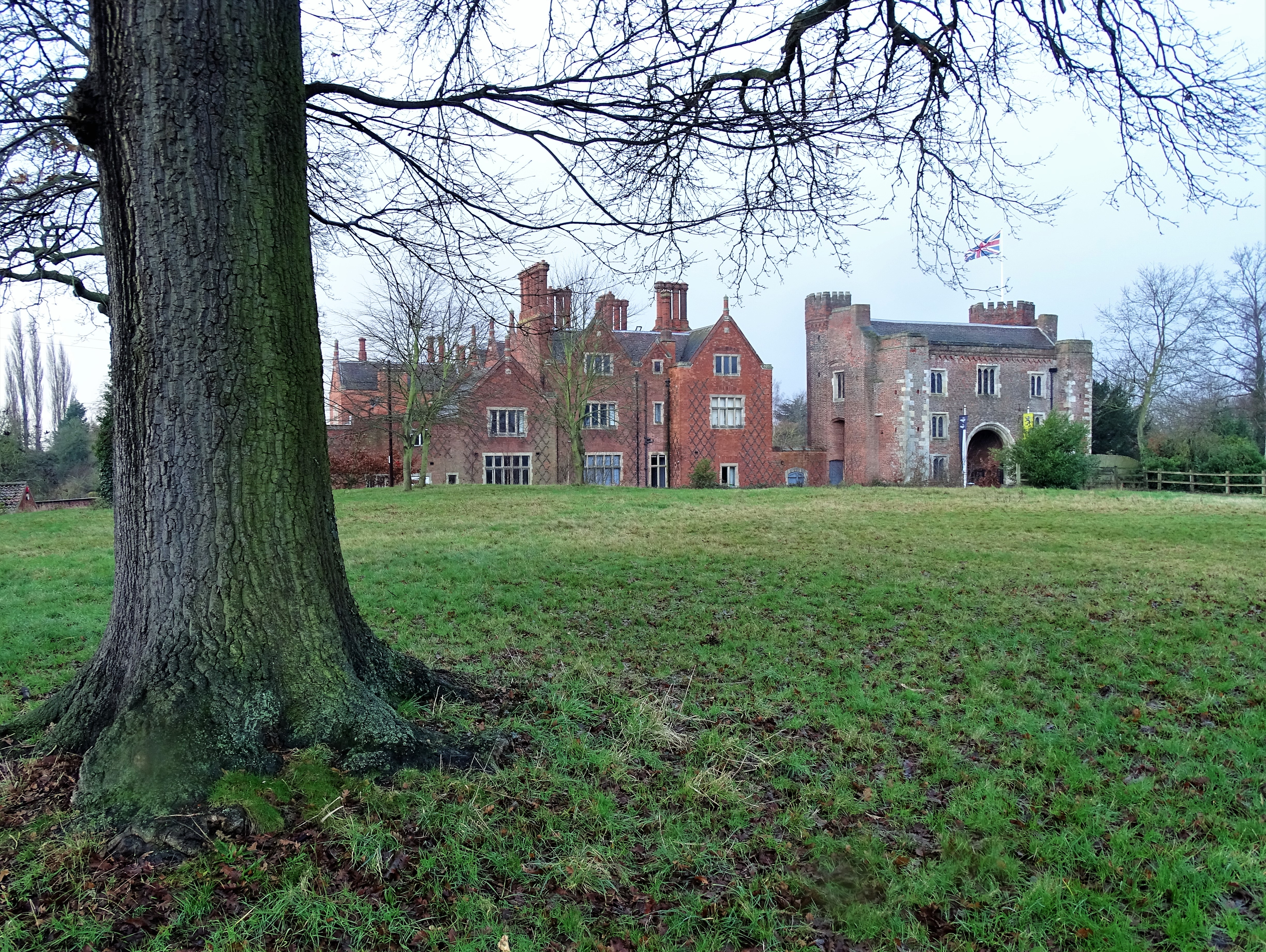

- Location within Nottinghamshire

General information
- Coordinates: 53.361667°N 1.082222°W

Website
- Hodsock Priory

Listed Building – Grade II
- Official name: Hodstock Priory
- Designated: 12 April 1985
- Reference no.: 1370097

Hodsock Priory is an English country house in Hodsock, Nottinghamshire, 4 miles (6.4 km) north of Worksop, England, and 1 mile (1.6 km) south of Blyth. Despite its name, it is not and never has been a priory. Hodsock is renowned for its snowdrops in early spring. It is also a venue for special events and weddings.

== Early history ==
Hodsock has been occupied since at least the Bronze Age and evidence of occupation from the Bronze Age, the Romans and Saxons is found in the gardens. Hodsock was mentioned in the Domesday Book: In ODESACH. hb.Vlsy .ii . car tre ad gld - 'In Hodsock Wulfsi had 2 carucates of land taxable'. (A carucate was 120 acres (0.49 km^{2}) of land.)

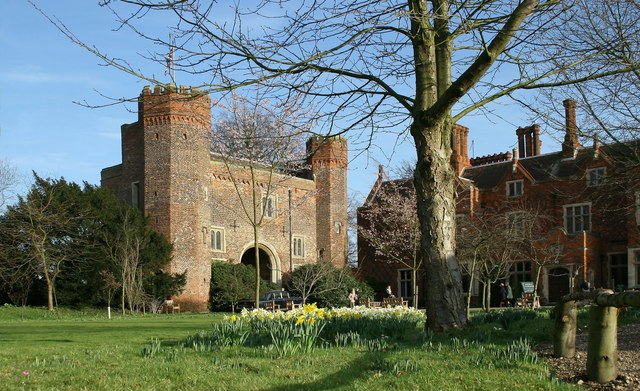
Hodstock Priory

The Cressey family, who owned Hodsock from the mid-12th century for more than 200 years, were powerful enough to entertain kings of England - Henry II, John, and Edward I.

The Clifton family took over the estate at the beginning of the 15th century and owned it through 14 generations to 1765. The Tudor Gatehouse was built in the early 16th Century by Sir Gervase Clifton (1516-1688) who was the favourite of successive Tudor Monarchs. Queen Elizabeth 1 referred to him as “Gervase the Gentle”. and Henry VIII visited him at his home Hodsock Priory in the summer of 1541 to bestow upon him his knighthood. It is possible that it is for this occasion that the gatehouse was built.

== The Mellish family ==
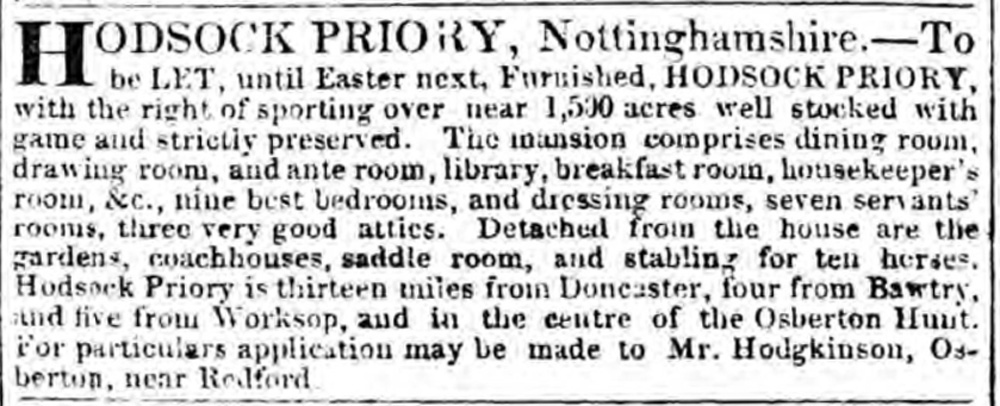
Rental notice for Hodsock Priory in 1840 before the major alterations of 1873 were made.

Hodsock Priory was sold by Sir Gervase Clifton in 1765, to William and his son Charles Mellish of Blyth Hall which was nearby. When Charles Mellish died in 1797 his son Henry Francis Mellish inherited both Blyth Hall and Hodsock Priory.

Henry Francis Mellish (1782-1817) was the second son of Charles Mellish and therefore not normally the heir. However his elder brother Joseph was disinherited because of his extravagance and gambling. Henry proved to be of similar character and by 1806 he was obliged to sell Blyth Hall to pay his gambling debts. Hodsock Priory then became the main residence of the Mellish family.

When he died in 1817 his sister Anne Chambers (1781-1855) inherited the house because he had no children. She made substantial alterations and additions to the property. She commissioned the eminent architect Ambrose Poynter to add a new south wing and Italian terrace in the Gothic Revival style. Both her sons predeceased her, so on her death in 1855 the estates passed to her cousin William Leigh Mellish.

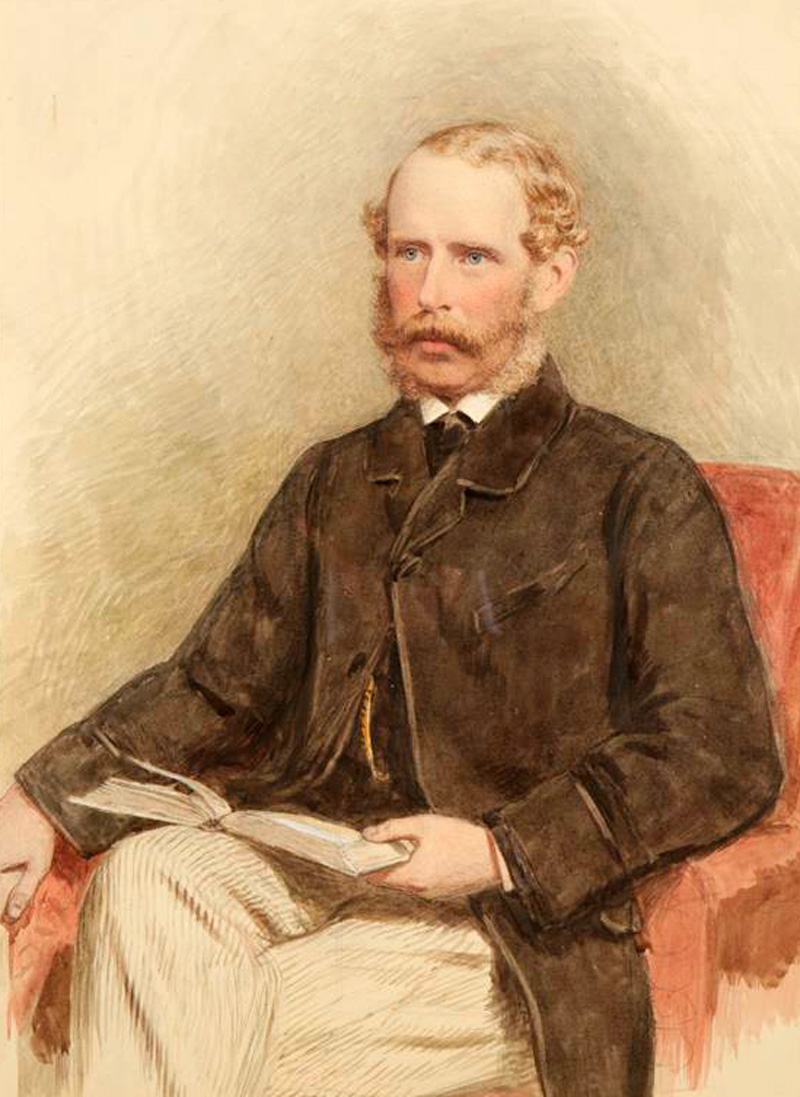
William Leigh Mellish in about 1860

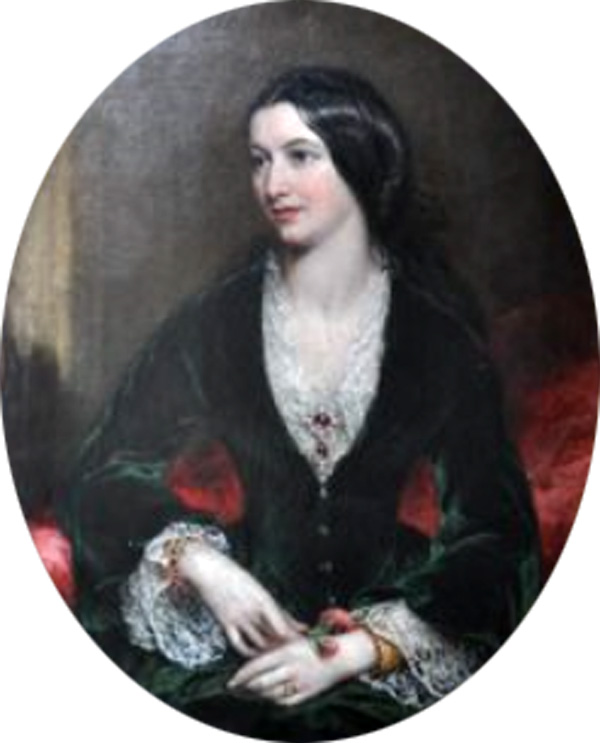
Margaret Mellish, wife of William Leigh Mellish

William Leigh Mellish (1813-1864) was the son of Rev Edward Mellish, Dean of Hereford. He was Colonel in the Rifle Brigade which was stationed in Canada and it was here that he met his wife Margaret Anne Cunard (1820-1901) daughter of Sir Samuel Cunard who founded the Cunard Shipping Line. They were married in 1843 in Halifax, Nova Scotia. The couple had five children - three sons and two daughters. Two of their sons died early: William Chambers Mellish as an infant and George Samuel Mellish of the Royal Artillery who died in Algiers in 1882 at the age of 21. There is a memorial window in his honour on the south wall of the parish nave in St Mary and St Martin's Church, Blyth. The 1861 Census records the family living at the house with a butler, a footman, a valet, a lady's maid, a governess, a housekeeper, a cook, a nurse, a nursery maid, two housemaids, two laundrymaids, a kitchenmaid and a groom.

In 1864 William died and his wife Margaret took control of the property. In 1873 she commissioned the architect George Devey to enlarge and alter the house. After her death in 1901 her only surviving son Henry Mellish (1856-1927) inherited Hodsock Priory. He was a bachelor who had a strong interest in meteorology and was a sharp shooter. He lived there with his two unmarried sisters Agnes and Evelyn. He died in 1927 and when the last Mellish sister died in 1935 Hodsock passed to his cousin, Mary Constance Mayhew (1901-1982) née Buchanan. Mary was the great-granddaughter of Frances Katherine Mellish (d. 1854), sister of William Leigh Mellish, who married Sir Andrew Buchanan (1807-1882), 1st baronet. Mary moved into Hodsock Priory in 1942, selling off some of the surrounding land and house contents by auction in 1946. In 1966 her nephew, Sir Andrew Buchanan, 5th baronet became the owner of the property. In 1991, he was appointed Lord Lieutenant of Nottinghamshire. The house is now owned by George and Katherine Buchanan.

The gardens at Hodsock were developed in the first half of the 20th century under the guidance of head gardener, Arthur Ford. Ford regularly wrote articles for gardening magazines, and was reputedly head-hunted by Kew Gardens. During the Second World War, the flower gardens were turned over to vegetables grown by the Women's Land Army, who were accommodated in the house. After 1945, the house remained the property of the Mellish family. The papers of the Mellish family and the Clifton family are held by Manuscripts and Special Collections at the University of Nottingham.

== The estate ==
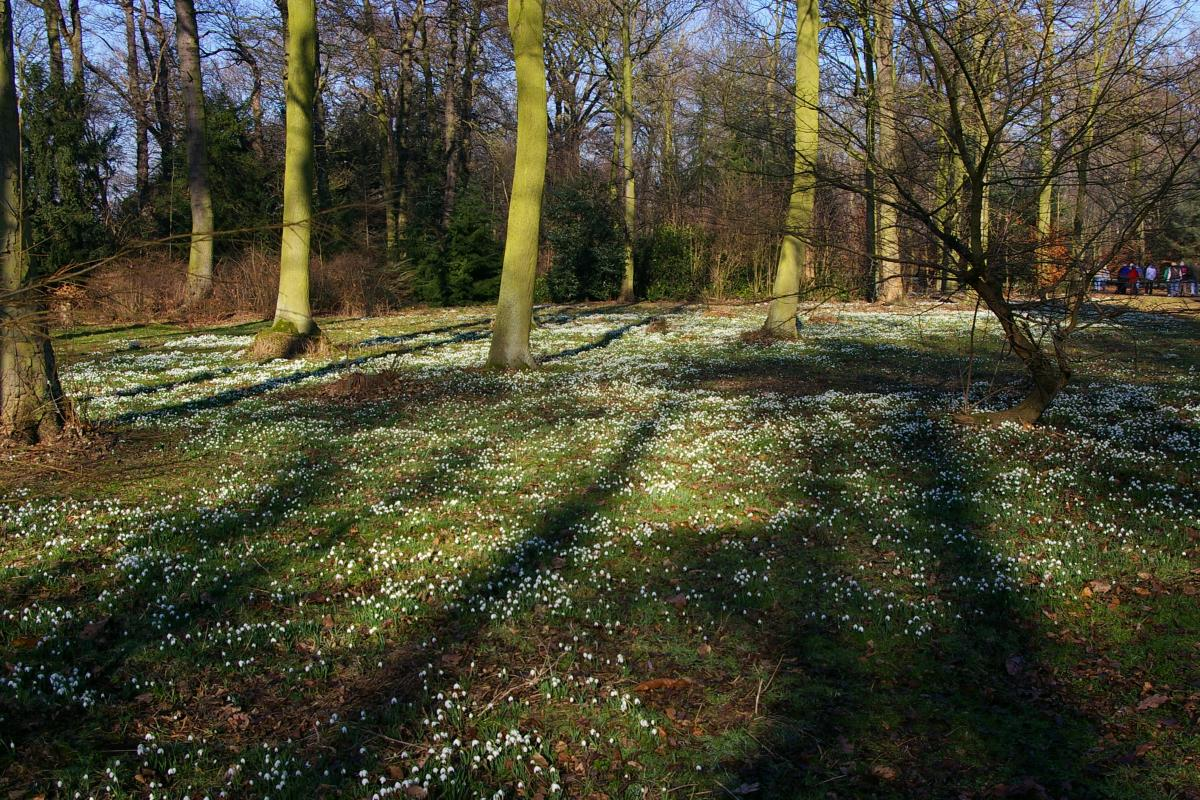
Snowdrops at Hodsock Priory

Hodsock Priory and gardens is at the centre of the 800-acre (3.2 km^{2}) Hodsock Estate, owned by the Buchanan family since 1765. The farm is 700 acres (2.8 km^{2}) and grows carrots, wheat, barley and sugar beet. There is 100 acres (0.40 km^{2}) of managed woodland.

A 20 million gallon irrigation reservoir, constructed in 1997, covers 7.5 acres (30,000 m^{2}). Carefully designed to blend with the landscape, the reservoir attracts wild waterfowl, including oystercatchers, great crested grebes and common shelducks. Elsewhere on the estate, bird life includes little owls, common kingfishers, common kestrels, green woodpeckers, hobbies, robins, Eurasian wrens and long-tailed tits. European hedgehogs, red foxes, moles, voles, shrews, water voles, European rabbits and European hares are common.

Neither the house nor the gardens and woods are open to general visitors. This is despite the fact that the woods are part of the National Collection. It is a venue for special events and weddings.

== See also ==
- Listed buildings in Hodsock
