= Oldcotes Dyke =

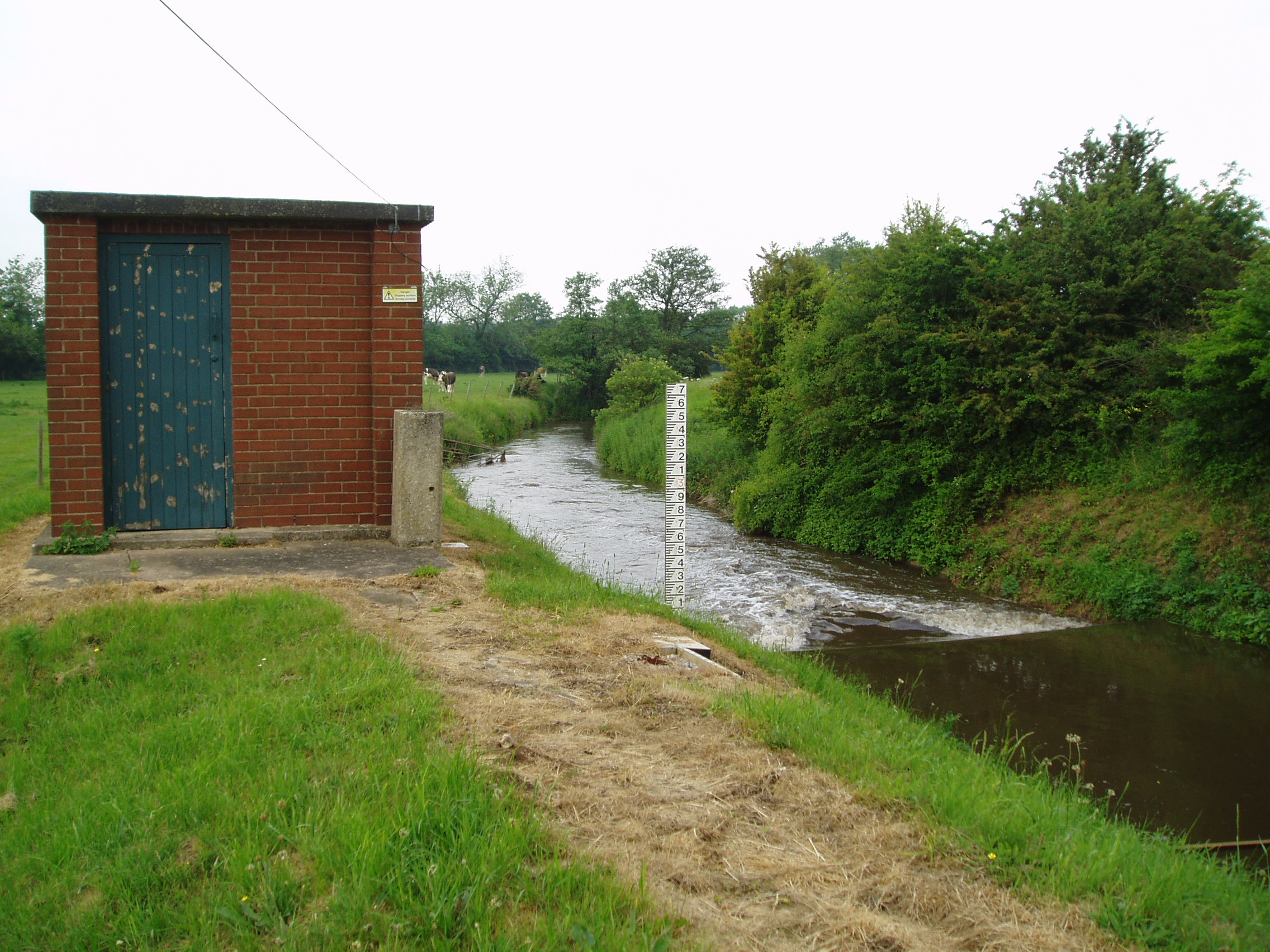
- The weir and gauging station that measure flow on Oldcotes Dyke before it joins the River Ryton

Location
- Country: England

Physical characteristics
- Source
  - location: Streams near Ravenfield and Hellaby
  - elevation: 410 feet (125 m)
- Mouth
  - location: River Ryton, Blyth
  - coordinates: 53°22′54″N 1°03′46″W
  - elevation: 39 feet (12 m)

Basin features
- Tributaries
  - right: New Hall Dike, Kingsforth Brook, Firbeck Dike, Lamb Lane Dike, Owlands Wood Dike

Oldcotes Dyke is the name of the final section of a river system that drains parts of north Nottinghamshire and the Metropolitan Borough of Rotherham in South Yorkshire, England. Historically, it has supported milling, with seven water mills drawing their power from its water, and ran through the grounds of the Cistercian Roche Abbey. It is a tributary of the River Ryton.

== Route ==
The river begins as a small stream near the 410-foot (125 m) contour and close to the B6093 Moor Lane South road at Ravenfield. If flows to the east, forming the southern boundary of the housing of the village, with open land on its south bank. It passes under Priests Bridge on Lidget Lane, and is briefly culverted as it flows under the M18 motorway and Hellaby Lane, to the north of Hellaby. It forms the eastern boundary of Hellaby Industrial Park. It runs beside a dismantled railway embankment, and is joined by an unnamed stream which also rises to the west of the M18 motorway. A little further to the south, Hellaby Bridge carries the A631 Rotherham to Bawtry road over the combined flow, and it is joined by Newhall Dike, which rises at Cum Well, further west but to the east of the motorway.

The river turns to the east, flowing along the southern edge of Maltby, to be joined by Kingsforth Brook. This rises besides Second Lane in Wickersley. Heading east it passes through King's Pond Plantation, a wood with a large pond in it, and under the motorway. It passes under Kingsforth Lane and Newhall Lane before turning to the north-east, to join Hellaby Dike. Shortly after passing under Carr Lane, Maltby, it turns to the south, and becomes Maltby Dike. The first of the historic mills on the river is Hooton Levitt mill. The farmhouse and attached mill building date from the late 18th century, but were rebuilt in the mid-19th century, and are Grade II listed structures. The wheelpit remains, but the breast-shot water wheel and associated machinery are no longer there. It was marked as a corn mill on the 1892 map, It was still marked as such in 1929, when there was a sewage treatment works with sludge beds, medier beds and storm lagoons just below it. The works was owned by the Maltby Urban District Council (UDC), but has since been removed. In 2007 Severn Trent Water, the successors to Maltby UDC, applied to turn the site into a hay meadow and grassland, when it would become part of the Maltby Low Common nature reserve.

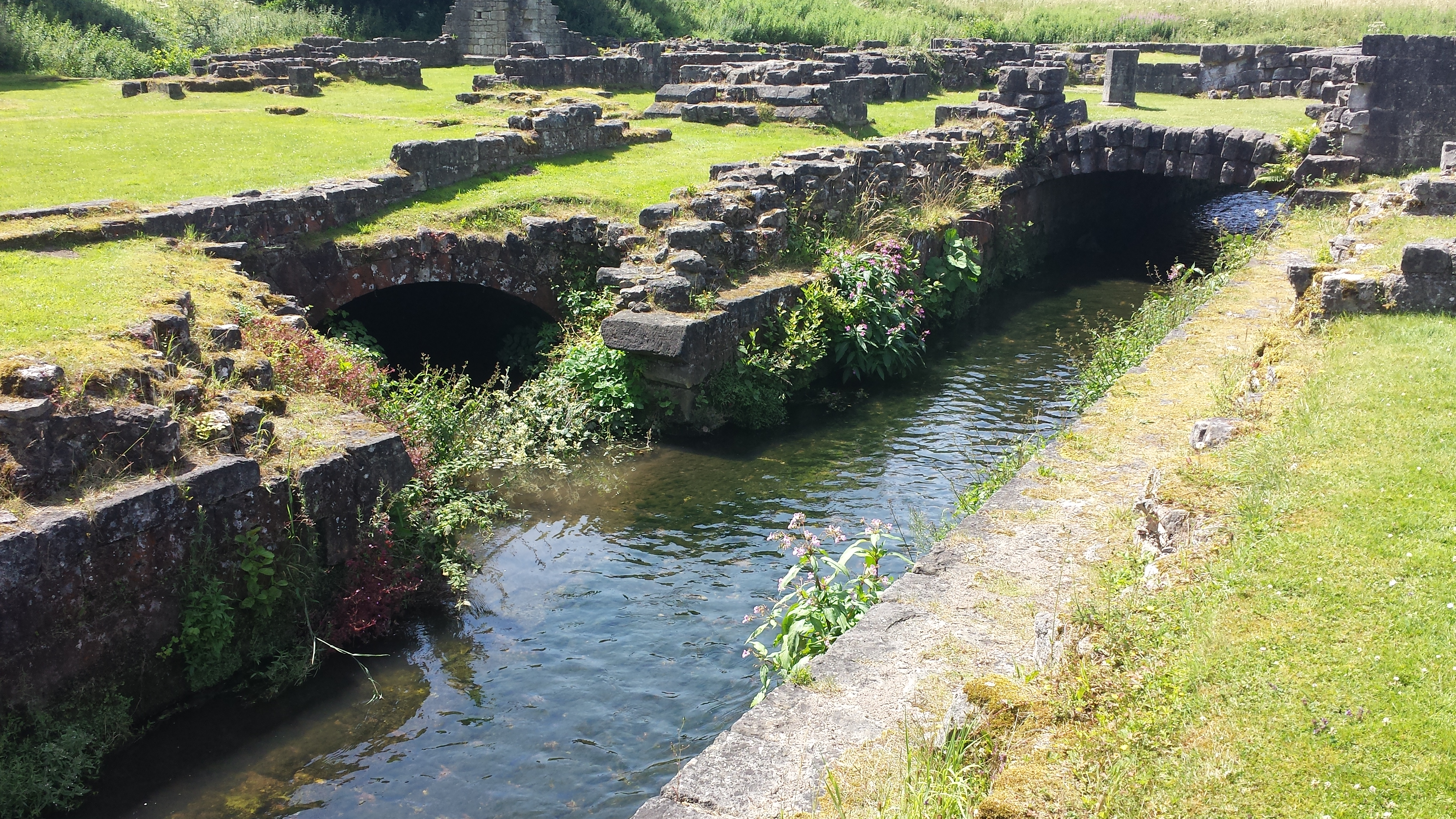
Maltby Dike flows under the former day room of Roche Abbey (right) and is joined by Hooton Dike (left) which flows through a medieval tunnel from Laughton Pond.

Heading south-east, the river is crossed by the Worksop to Doncaster freight railway. Beyond it, on the southern bank, is the new sewage treatment works owned by Severn Trent Water. It is strung out along the river, hemmed in by the steep sides of the valley, until Sheep Wash bridge at Gypsy Lane is reached. Beyond the bridge are the grounds of Roche Abbey. The Cistercian Abbey was founded in 1147, and Sandbeck was granted to the community in 1241. After the Dissolution of the Monasteries in the 1530s, the abbey was sold as a monastic manor. The Saunderson family gradually bought the components of the estate in the later 16th and early 17th centuries. Roche was bought by Nicholas Saunderson, 1st Viscount Castleton in 1627. The estate passed to Sir Thomas Lumley in 1723, and his son, Richard Lumley-Saunderson, 4th Earl of Scarbrough employed the landscape architect Capability Brown to landscape the estate in 1760. The Sandbeck estate is still privately owned, although the ruins of the abbey are managed by English Heritage. Of all the Cistercian monasteries in England, the ground plan at Roche is one of the most complete, and despite much of the complex being dismantled after the dissolution of 1538, the early gothic transepts survive, and are some of the finest examples of the style in Britain.

As part of Capability Brown's landscaping, the monastic channels which had carried the dike through the site for hundreds of years were filled in, to create a meandering stream and a lake, covering the southern part of the complex. Brown's concept of a "romantic ruin" passed out of favour, and James H. Aveling began the process of excavating the site in the late 1850s. He published a book recording what he had found in 1870, the first such publication about a monastic site in Britain. Larger scale removal of Brown's infilling of the site began in the 1880s, when the 10th Earl of Scarborough ensured that the process was recorded photographically. Responsibility for the ruins passed to the State following the First World War, after which Brown's lake was drained and the original water channels were rediscovered and reinstated. The Office of Works used the work as a way to provide jobs for the unemployed. Two cutwaters are visible, one to the west of the site near the 18th century banquetting lodge, and the other at the east of the site, which carries the public footpath to Laughton Pond. The waters of the dike were used to power a water mill during the monastic period.

=== Hooton Dike ===
Just below the Abbey complex, the river is joined by Hooton Dike. This rises close to the 425-foot (130 m) contour on land which was once the edges of Thurcroft Colliery, until its closure in 1991. It flows eastwards under some old railway embankments which were part of the colliery, and the former junction of the Thurcroft Colliery Branch and the defunct Braithwell and Laughton Railway. Beyond the embankments, it is called Brookhouse Dike, and flows under the main road in Brookhouse and the Worksop to Doncaster freight railway. To the south of the hamlet of Slade Hooton, Hooton Bridge carries Hooton Lane over it, and there is a sewage treatment works on the north bank. Like the Maltby treatment works, it is strung along the bank, because the valley has steep sides. Beyond the works, the river is called Hooton Brook.

The course of the river turns towards the north-east, and it enters Laughton Pond, a large artificial lake, created by Capability Brown and completed in 1776. At its north-eastern is a 10-foot (3.0 m) cascade, also built as part of Brown's landscaping project. It is constructed of irregular Magnesian Limestone blocks, arranged in tiers. Nearby is a tunnel, which enters the bank wall below the pond. From it, a channel connects to the Maltby Dike. It shows signs of being adapted in the 1760s, but its origins are clearly older, probably medieval.

=== Firbeck Dike ===
The river and its banks below the junction of Hooton Dike and Maltby Dike continues to be part of Sandbeck Park, almost to King's Wood Lane, at the hamlet of Stone. Just before the bridge was another corn mill, called Roche Abbey Mill. The grade II listed mill farmhouse dating from around 1800 still exists, but the mill itself does not. Beyond the bridge, and before the next bridge, is Stone Mill. The mill house and attached mill building survive. They date from the 17th century, but were enlarged in the 18th and 19th centuries. The position of the wheel is indicated by an ashlar-faced wall, and internally, there is evidence that it drove two sets of wheels.

The river now becomes Firbeck Dike, and passes under New Road to curve around the northern and eastern edges of the Firbeck Hall estate. There is a lake at the junction with Lamb Lane Dike. This rises to the south-west of Letwell and flows northwards under Lamb Lane, here designated the B6463. It is joined by another stream, flowing south-east from a large lake at Lingodel Farm. It then enters the grounds of the Park Hill estate. There was a fishpond with a dam at its north-eastern end in 1902, and there are further lakes, which were in front of Park Hill, a large house once owned by Anthony St Leger, famous for initiating the St Leger Stakes horse race in 1776. The main house was demolished in 1935, but there are still some grade II listed farmbuildings, which were probably stables for the main house, nearby.

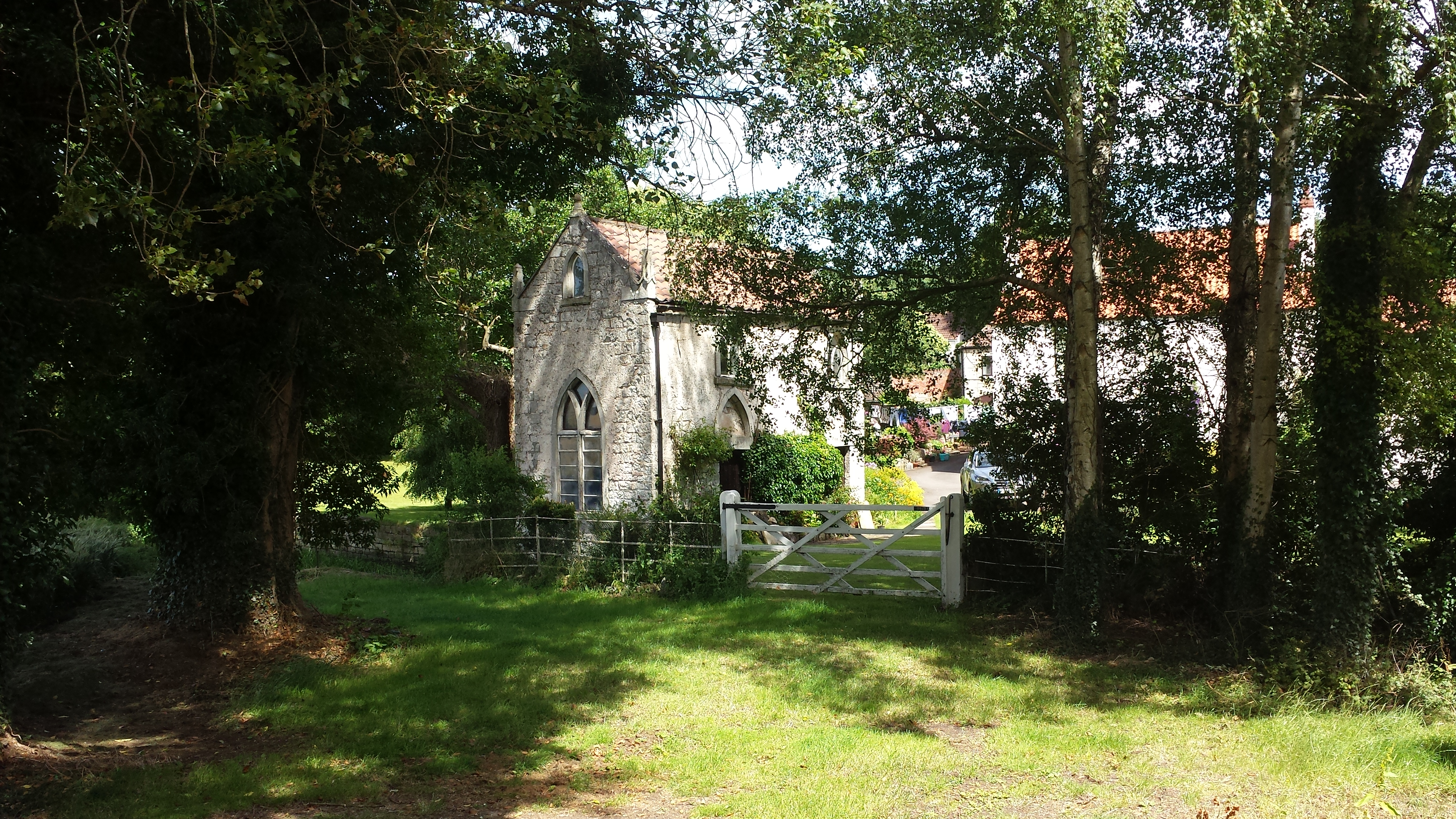
A small outbuilding at Yews Mill, on Firbeck Dike, which is thought to have been a mill, and carries the date 1806.

Another set of lakes are in front of Firbeck Hall, a country house with a 16th-century core, which was remodelled and extended in the 18th and 19th centuries. It became a country club in 1935, when Cyril Nicholson, a Sheffield stockbroker, invested £80,000 in its art deco renovation. The club was short-lived, due to the onset of the Second World War, and it was subsequently used as a rehabilitation centre until 1990, after which it fell into dereliction. The level of the lakes is controlled by a weir, built as part of a single-arched bridge constructed in the early 19th century for H. Gally Knight, who owned the hall at the time.

Below the junction of the two streams, and a little further to the east was Yews Mill. Little remains of the original building, although parts of it, dating from the early 18th century, have been incorporated into Yews Mill House. The mill race is still visible, and there is a suggestion that it was once a paper mill, which might account for its small scale. It was shown as a corn mill on the map for 1902. On the main course of the river is another small building connected to a bridge, which carries the date 1806, which is also thought to have been a mill. Neither the wheel pit, not any of the machinery survives.

=== Oldcotes Dyke ===
The mill stream rejoins the main course to pass under a bridge carrying Haven Hill, and the river becomes Oldcotes Dyke. It passes to the south of Oldcotes, and Goldthorpe Mill is situated to the west of the A60 Worksop to Tickhill road. It is an early 18th-century building, with later additions, and has been converted into a house. It still contains a steel water wheel dating from the late 19th century, and parts of the wooden machinery. The mill race and main stream combine on the eastern side of the A60 road, and soon it reaches Oldcotes Mill, to the east of the village. This dates from the late 18th and early 19th centuries. The wheel drove 3 sets of stones, and much of the machinery is still in situ. It is inscribed "John Thornton Millwright Engineer & C Worksop". Both mills were producing flour in the 1880s.

The river passes through Fishpond Plantation, and turns to the south east, running parallel to the A634 road from Oldcotes to Blyth. As it nears Blyth, it drops below the 50-foot (15 m) contour, and is joined by Hodsock Brook. The river turns to the north-east to pass under the A634 at Old Bridge. Beyond the bridge is a gauging station, to measure flow, and the river sweeps round in an arc to join the River Ryton by Bawtry Road, Blyth.

=== Hodsock Brook ===
Hodsock Brook rises as a series of springs near Gildingwells. The stream flows eastwards, through Langold Holt, a wooded area with a pond in its centre, crosses the border from the Metropolitan Borough of Rotherham into Nottinghamshire, and enters the upper of two lakes that are part of Langold Country Park. A weir lowers the level into the second lake, and the overflow from this flows through woods and through a culvert beneath the remains of the railway sidings for Firbeck Colliery, Langold. Next is passes under the A60 Doncaster Road and to the north of Hodsock Lodge Farm. There is a sewage treatment works on the northern bank, opposite the farm. On the edge of woods called New Plantation, it is joined by Owlands Wood Dike and turns abruptly to the north, to join Oldcotes Dyke.

Owlands Wood Dike begins at a pond to the south of Gildingwells, and initially flows south. The Rotherham and Nottinghamshire border follows the course of the stream, which then turns to the east. The border turns to the south and leaves the river just before it reaches Corn Mill Farm. A water mill constructed of stone with a roof of pantiles was built at the site around 1800 by the father of Sir T. W. White. It was disused by 1897, and the machinery was removed in 1928 when the building was converted into a house. The dike is joined by a stream from Wallingwells, once the site of Wallingwells Priory and now occupied by a 17th-century country house. The house was divided into seven dwellings in 1926. The stream is the outflow of two lakes, connected together by sluices. On the eastern edge of Holme Wood, Owlands Wood Dike splits, and the two channels both enter Carlton Lake, which feeds South Carlton Corn Mill. The building dates from the late 18th and mid 19th centuries, and the cast iron water wheel is still in situ. It drove three sets of stones, and internally, most of the machinery still exists although it is not functional. A two-arched bridge with a stepped overshoot for the mill race, built in the 1830s, carries Church Lane over the Dike. After passing under the A60 Doncaster Road, it heads north-east, to reach Hodsock Priory. There are a number of channels in the vicinity of the Priory, a country house originally build in 1829, but remodelled by George Devey between 1873 and 1876. While the Priory is Grade II listed, the Gatehouse and a bridge over a dry moat are Grade I listed structures. The gatehouse dates from the early 16th century, and the bridge is slightly later, although it was restored in the 18th and 19th centuries. To the north of Hodsock Priory, Owlands Wood Dike joins Hodsock Brook.

== Water quality ==
The Environment Agency assesses the water quality within the river systems in England. Each is given an overall ecological status, which may be one of five levels: high, good, moderate, poor and bad. There are several components that are used to determine this, including biological status, which looks at the quantity and varieties of invertebrates, angiosperms and fish. Chemical status, which compares the concentrations of various chemicals against known safe concentrations, is rated good or fail.

The water quality of the Oldcotes Dyke system was as follows in 2019.

Section	Ecological Status	Chemical Status	Length	Catchment
Oldcotes Dyke Catchment (trib of Ryton)	Poor	Fail	16.5 miles (26.6 km)	22.75 square miles (58.9 km^{2})
Hodsock Brook (to Oldcoates Dyke)	Moderate	Fail	1.5 miles (2.4 km)	4.44 square miles (11.5 km^{2})
Owlands Wood Dyke from Source to Hodsock Brook	Moderate	Fail	5.6 miles (9.0 km)	9.31 square miles (24.1 km^{2})

The first row is for Oldcodes Dyke from its junction with the River Ryton westwards to Maltby Dike, but stopping at the M18 motorway. Like most rivers in the UK, the chemical status changed from good to fail in 2019, due to the presence of polybrominated diphenyl ethers (PBDE), perfluorooctane sulphonate (PFOS) and mercury compounds, none of which had previously been included in the assessment.

There was a significant pollution incident in 2014, when a pipeline carrying raw sewage ruptured twice, on 25 February and 26 March. The sewage ran onto agricultural land, and into Slacks Pond, a private fishing lake, which discharged into Kingsforth Brook, and subsequently into Maltby Dike. The incident resulted in a number of fish dying, and the population of certain invertebrates, including fresh water shrimps, being depleted. Because Severn Trent Water, the owner of the pipeline, had received two previous warnings about similar incidents at this location, they were fined £480,000, and ordered to pays the costs of the Environment Agency, who brought the case to court. The costs were a further £13,675.38, and the fine was one of the largest ever imposed upon a water company in the United Kingdom for negligence. The water company replaced the underground pipeline in August 2014. It had been installed 35 years previously, and was used to pump sewage to a treatment work. They also restocked fish in the river.

== Points of interest ==
Point	Coordinates (Links to map resources)	OS Grid Ref	Notes
Source of Hellaby Brook	53.4368°N 1.2660°W	SK488935	
Source of Newhall Dike	53.4186°N 1.2489°W	SK500915	Cum Well
Source of Kingsforth Brook	53.4110°N 1.2691°W	SK486907	
Junction with Kingsforth Brook	53.4214°N 1.2253°W	SK515919	
Roche Abbey grounds	53.4019°N 1.1840°W	SK543897	
Source of Hooton Dike	53.4042°N 1.2568°W	SK495899	
Slade Hooton Sewage Works	53.3930°N 1.2130°W	SK524887	
Source of Lamb Lane Dike	53.3716°N 1.1697°W	SK553864	
Junction with Lamb Lane Dike	53.3934°N 1.1435°W	SK570888	
Oldcotes Mill	53.3889°N 1.1072°W	SK594883	
Source of Hodsock Brook	53.3637°N 1.1609°W	SK559855	
Source of Owlands Wood Dike	53.3571°N 1.1624°W	SK558847	
South Carlton Mill	53.3479°N 1.1187°W	SK587838	
Hodsock Priory	53.3618°N 1.0851°W	SK609853	
Hodsock Brook joins Oldcotes Dyke	53.3784°N 1.0812°W	SK612872	Mouth

== See also ==
Media related to Oldcotes Dyke at Wikimedia Commons
