= River Ryton =

River in Nottinghamshire, England

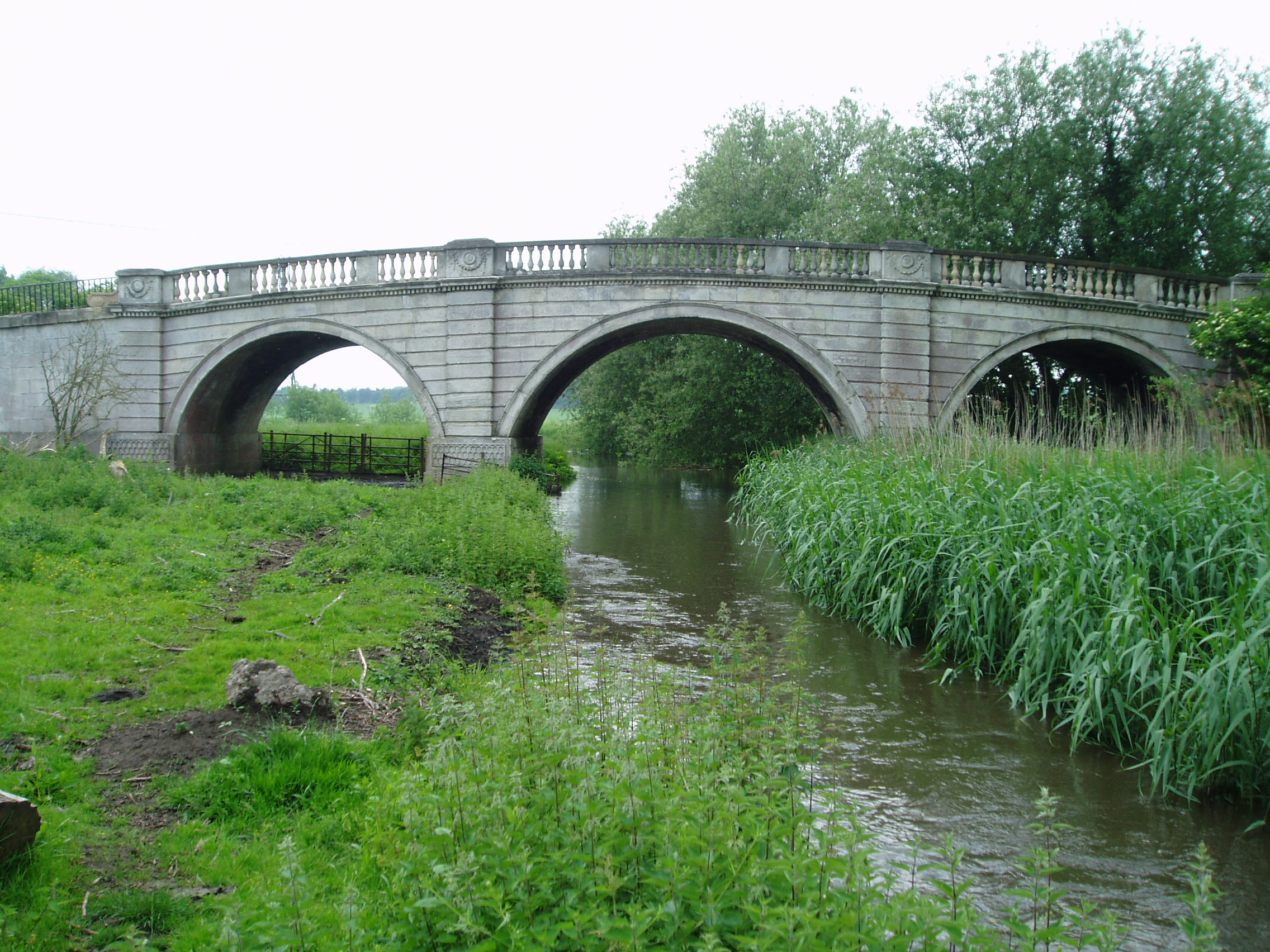
- The Grade I listed Blyth New Bridge carries the A634 over the river.

Location
- Country: England

Physical characteristics
- Source
  - location: Several streams near Lindrick Common
  - elevation: 260 feet (79 m)
- Mouth
  - location: River Idle, Bawtry
  - coordinates: 53.421976°N 1.012153°W
  - elevation: 10 feet (3.0 m)
- Length: 21 mi (34 km)

Basin features
- Tributaries
  - left: Anston Brook, Oldcotes Dyke
  - right: Pudding Dyke, Bondhay Dyke

The River Ryton is a tributary of the River Idle. It rises close to the Chesterfield Canal near Kiveton Park, and is joined by a series of tributaries near Lindrick Common in the Metropolitan Borough of Rotherham, South Yorkshire, England. Most of its course is in Nottinghamshire, flowing through the town of Worksop. It meanders northwards to join the River Idle near the town of Bawtry on the South Yorkshire-Nottinghamshire border.

While much of its route is rural, its course through Worksop is man made, a result of development and milling. It used to flow through Scrooby, where there was a mill, but was diverted northwards in the 1960s. It supplies water to the Chesterfield Canal through two feeders, and a number of the bridges which cross it are of interest architecturally, which has resulted in them becoming Listed structures.

The water quality of the river is moderate, as a considerable proportion of the total flow is supplied by the processed water from sewage treatment works. Despite this, there are significant populations of fish in the river, and it is used for organised angling.

== Hydrology ==
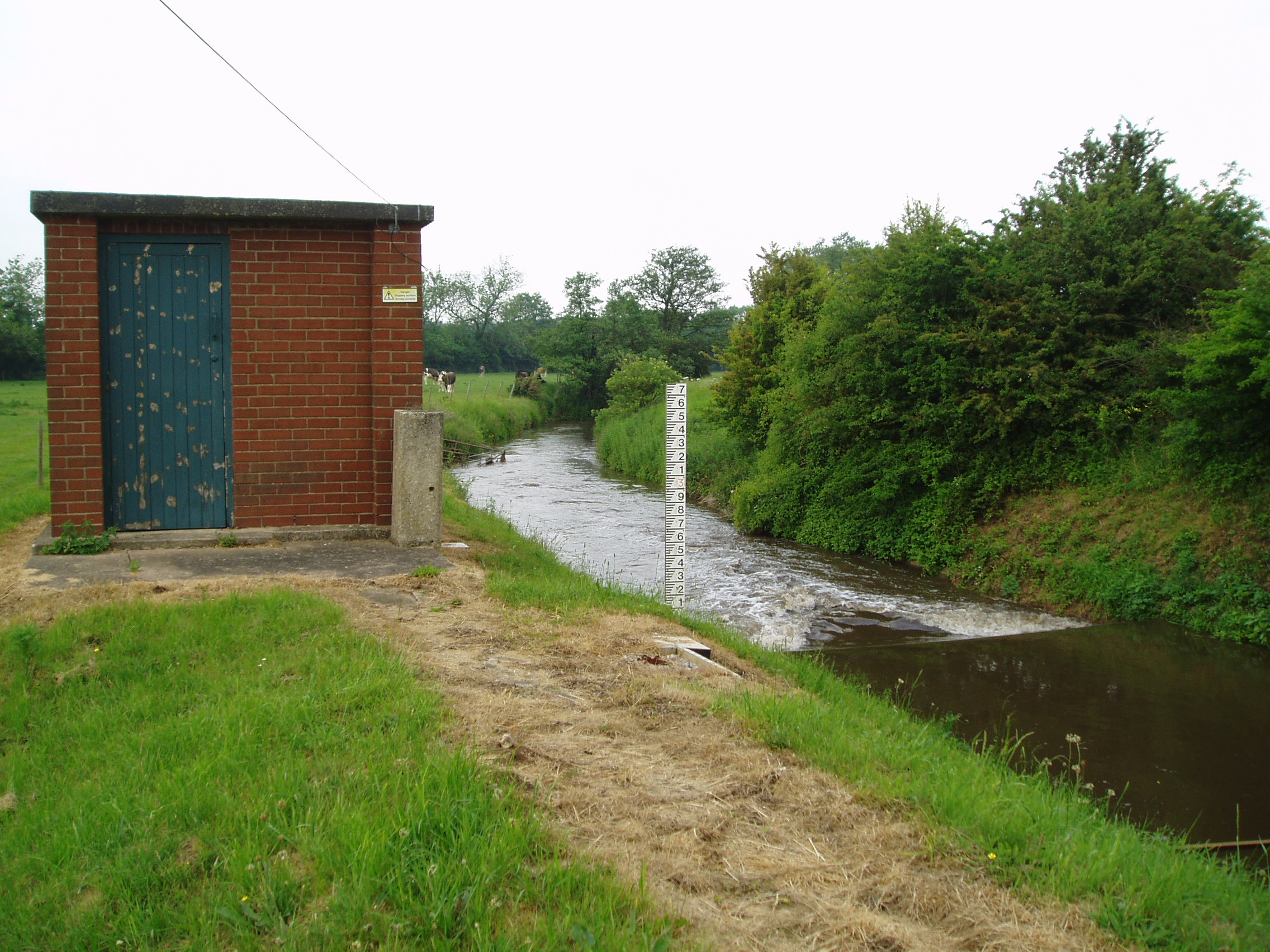
The weir and gauging station which measures the flow on Oldcotes Dyke before it joins the Ryton.

The region through which the river flows is underlaid by an extensive water-bearing porous rock structure called the Magnesian Limestone aquifer, which is near the surface in the west and dips downwards to the east. Magnesian Limestone is so called because it contains quantities of the mineral Dolomite, which is rich in Magnesium. The Triassic Sherwood Sandstone aquifer is another porous rock layer which covers this to the east, and is the major geological component of the area. Further east, they are both covered by a layer of Mercia Mudstone. Where these aquifers reach the surface, they often supply water to the river system, but can also take water from it. This is affected by the extraction of groundwater, particularly for public water supply, and by fracturing of the aquifers as a result of subsidence caused by deep coal mining.

The Ryton draws its water from the Anston Brook, the Pudding Dyke, the Bondhay Dyke, and to a lesser extent the Broadbridge Dyke. Prior to the construction of the Chesterfield Canal in the 1770s, the flow of the Broadbridge Dyke was much greater, but water from its catchment area was diverted to form the reservoirs at Pebley and Harthill, which supply the canal. Overflow from the reservoirs reaches the Ryton by the Pudding Dyke, but the river also supplies water to the canal via the Brancliffe feeder and the Kilton feeder. The natural water sources are supplemented by the outflows from Dinnington and Anston Sewage Treatment Works into the Anston Brook, which together provide about 7 Ml/d (megalitres per day), while Kilton Treatment Works supplies about 12.8 Ml/d. At Manton, excess flow from the canal tops up the river, and water pumped from Manton Colliery formerly performed the same function. With the closure of the mine, a new borehole was constructed in 2004, and water is pumped from the Sherwood Sandstone aquifer into the river. The borehole is operated by Severn Trent Water.

In order to monitor flows on the river, the Environment Agency maintain gauging stations, one to the east of Worksop and a second to the east of Blyth at Craig y Nos. They also have one on Oldcotes dyke, just below Blyth Old Bridge. The catchment area above the Worksop gauging station is 29.7 square miles (77 km^{2}) and the mean flow is 8.55 million gallons (38.88 Megalitres) per day. The catchment receives 25.8 inches (655 mm) of rainfall in an average year. Oldcoates Dyke contributes 12.92 million gallons (58.75 Ml) per day, and the flow at the Blyth gauging station amounts to 28.89 million gallons (131.3 Ml) per day, derived from a catchment area of 89 square miles (231 km^{2}). This station has been operational since 1984. Previously, there was a gauging station a little further downstream at Serlby Park, but this was decommissioned in 1978, as the flow readings in the summer were not reliable. Data from the Blyth station is transmitted to the pumping station at West Stockwith, where it is used to control discharges from the River Idle into the River Trent.

Normal river levels at Worksop vary between 0.5 feet (0.15 m) and 0.92 feet (0.28 m), but when the weather is more extreme, can rise up to 3.43 feet (1.05 m). The highest level recorded at the gauging station was on 26 June 2007, when it reached 7.19 feet (2.19 m). At Blyth, the normal range is from 1.38 feet (0.42 m) to 2.53 feet (0.77 m), rising to 5.25 feet (1.60 m) in severe weather. The highest level recorded was on 8 November 2019, when the river level reached 7.62 feet (2.32 m).

== Course ==
The River Ryton starts to the east of Kiveton Park, next to the Chesterfield Canal, close to the 260-foot (79 m) contour. It is accompanied by the Sheffield to Lincoln Railway line which crosses it three times, before its flow is supplemented by Pudding Dyke, flowing northwards from Thorpe Salvin. It passes under the railway again, and under the freight line from Worksop to Doncaster Railport. At Lindrick Dale, Anston Brook, flowing in from beyond Anston to the west, joins on the left bank. Shortly afterwards, the Brancliffe feeder leaves the river, following an S-shaped course to supply water to the Chesterfield Canal near Turner Wood locks. A little further east, it crosses under the Sheffield to Lincoln Line again and through a three-arched aqueduct below the Canal, to pass through Shireoaks. It then loops around the village of Rhodesia, crossing under the Worksop to Nottingham railway line and the A57 Worksop bypass to arrive on the western edge of Worksop.

In Worksop, the river was used to power mills for centuries. Three water mills were mentioned in a survey carried out in 1636, one near the present junction of Westgate and Newcastle Avenue, one called Priory Mill, and a third called Bracebridge mill. All had ceased to operate by 1826, but a new water mill had been constructed further to the west, near to the present junction of Newcastle Avenue and the A57 Worksop bypass. It was known as Beard's mill, after its owner Mr. Joseph Beard, and the mill pond was a hive of activity, being used as a skating rink in winter, and for fishing at other times of the year. More exotic activity recorded includes demonstrations of the launching of a lifeboat, and the bathing of elephants when travelling circuses visited the town. The mill building lasted until 1985, when it was demolished to make way for the Worksop bypass.

The course of the Ryton through Worksop is largely man-made. It originally flowed much nearer to Castle Hill, probably forming part of the defences, but was diverted in 1842 into a channel further north when the 4th Duke of Newcastle constructed Newcastle Street, in order to develop that part of the town. The river is then culverted as it passes under a shopping complex and the shops of Bridge Street. This section counts as a confined space, and was surveyed in 2007, in a joint venture between the Environment Agency, a team of divers, and Bassetlaw District Council. Some five tons of debris, half a ton of steel, and some stolen goods were removed from the culvert during the exercise. Beyond Watson Road bridge, sluices and extra channels point to the existence of the mill near the Priory. Priory Water Mill was in use from the medieval period until 1876, and a large lake called the Canch was formed in 1820, by constructing a dam across the leat which fed it. The Canch gradually became polluted, and was filled in when milling ceased in 1876. The buildings were utilised by William Bramer and Sons for their business of making chairs until they burnt down in 1912, and the site has more recently become the location of a sensory garden. Three channels continue under Priorswell Road through separate bridges, cross Bracebridge field, and join up again near the old High Hoe Road bridge.

=== Below Worksop ===
Continuing under the new High Hoe Road bridge, the river passes the derelict Grade II listed Italianate pumping station built in 1881 to pump sewage away from Worksop, before passing under the Chesterfield Canal again, through a 3-arched aqueduct. A feeder, which is at a higher level, passes under the canal through a culvert, and joins the canal through a sluice just below Kilton lock, after which the river and canal run parallel, until they pass through separate arches of a nine-arched viaduct which carries the Sheffield to Lincoln Railway line, opened in 1849. The river then follows a winding course through the estate of Osberton Hall and the village of Scofton, turning north to skirt the western edge of Ranby. Ranby Chequer Bridge marks the point at which the river, having flowed eastwards for most of its course, turns to the north west. The bridge itself can be reached from Ranby village by a footpath which runs along the central reservation of the A1 road for a short distance. The next major crossing is the B6045 at Hodsock Red Bridge, its three arches constructed of red bricks with stone lining, after which an early 19th-century Grade II listed twin-arched bridge carries the drive to Hodsock Priory over the river.

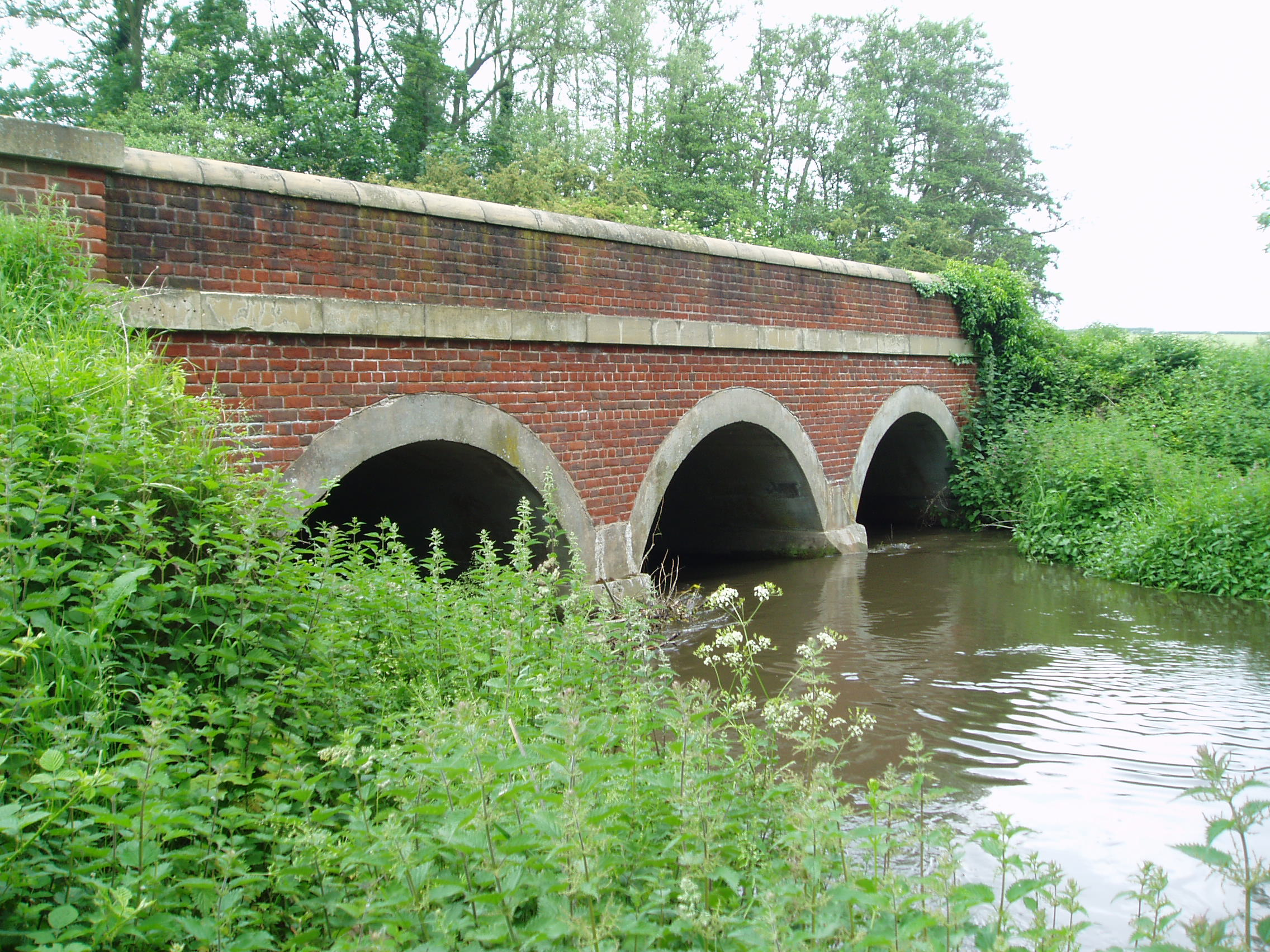
Hodsock Red Bridge carries the B6045 over the river near Blyth.

Then comes the A634 to the west of Blyth. The bridge here has three arches, was built for William Mellish of Blyth Hall around 1770, probably by the architect and bridge designer John Carr of York, and is a Grade I listed structure. Despite its age, it is called Blyth New Bridge, to distinguish it from Blyth Old Bridge which carries the same road over Oldcotes Dyke, a little further to the west. Before the next crossing of the B6045, the river is joined by Oldcotes Dyke, which flows eastwards from Roche Abbey, and drainage of the surrounding flood plain from here to the Idle is managed by the Rivers Idle and Ryton Internal Drainage Board. A network of drainage channels accompany the river from here to the junction with the River Idle, passing under the A1 road, collecting the runoff from the drainage channels of Whitewater Common, and skirting Serlby and Scrooby. To the north of Scrooby, the channel passes under the A638 Great North Road, the road into Scrooby village and the East Coast Main Line railway, crossing the 16-foot (5 m) contour at the railway bridge. The Great North Road bypassed Scrooby, passing to the west of the village, when it was reconstructed as a turnpike road in 1776. The construction included a number of brick arches, to allow the Ryton to flow under it even in times of flood, which can still be seen from Mill Lane. The river used to flow through the village, and powered Scrooby water mill, an 18th-century mill which was used to grind corn. Milling stopped in 1939, and the river was diverted to follow its present course further to the north in the 1960s. Beyond the railway, flood banks have been raised on both sides of the channel until it meets the River Idle just above Bawtry bridge, the limit of navigation on that river.

== Water quality ==
In order for wildlife, particularly fish, to thrive, the quality of the water needs to be good. The Environment Agency used a six-stage rating scale, from 'A' to 'F', called the General Quality Assessment, to classify rivers. 'A' on the GQA was the best quality of water, while 'F' was the poorest. Factors which affect the quality are levels of ammonia, levels of dissolved oxygen and the Biochemical oxygen demand (BOD), which measures the amount of dissolved oxygen needed by organisms to break down organic matter in the water. These factors are generally worse when the water is discharged from sewage treatment processes, and tend to be worse in summer, when such discharges make up a greater proportion of the total flow in the river. Water quality steadily improved as a result of investment in the treatment processes, funded by the water industry's Asset Management Plan. Good flows help the water to purify itself. In 2006, the upper Ryton was rated at 'B' on the GQA scale, and Oldcotes Dyke was rated at 'C'.

This classification system has been superseded for the water quality within the river systems in England. Each is given an overall ecological status, which may be one of five levels: high, good, moderate, poor and bad. There are several components that are used to determine this, including biological status, which looks at the quantity and varieties of invertebrates, angiosperms and fish. Chemical status, which compares the concentrations of various chemicals against known safe concentrations, is rated as good or fail.

The water quality of the Ryton was as follows in 2019.

Section	Ecological Status	Chemical Status	Length	Catchment
Ryton from Chesterfield Canal to Anston Brook	Good	Fail	1.9 miles (3.1 km)	3.24 square miles (8.4 km^{2})
Anston Brook from Source to Ryton	Moderate	Fail	8.5 miles (13.7 km)	8.35 square miles (21.6 km^{2})
Oldcotes Dyke Catchment	Poor	Fail	16.5 miles (26.6 km)	22.75 square miles (58.9 km^{2})
Ryton from Anston Brook to Idle	Moderate	Fail	23.6 miles (38.0 km)	42.19 square miles (109.3 km^{2})

The reasons for the ecological quality being less than good include the discharge of effluent from sewage treatment works, and drainage from the transport infrastructure. Oldcotes Dyke is also affected by runoff from agricultural land. Like most rivers in the UK, the chemical status changed from good to fail in 2019, due to the presence of polybrominated diphenyl ethers (PBDE), perfluorooctane sulphonate (PFOS) and mercury compounds, none of which had previously been included in the assessment.

The river Ryton supports various types of fish. In 2006, very few lived in the upper reaches, including the Anston Brook, because the water was only of moderate quality. A number of small streams contribute to the improvement of water quality, so that wild brown trout thrive as far as Worksop. Some trout and various types of cyprinids inhabit the water below Worksop, although abstraction of water results in spawning grounds and the habitats where the young fry live drying out during most summers, which has resulted in a decline in their numbers. Nevertheless, the lower reaches are still used for organised angling, and are the only part of the River Idle system where this activity takes place.

== Points of interest ==
Point	Coordinates (Links to map resources)	OS Grid Ref	Notes
Source	53.3348°N 1.1910°W	SK539822	Anston Brook and Pudding Dyke join
Shireoaks Aqueduct	53.3251°N 1.1749°W	SK550812	Chesterfield Canal crosses
Bridge Street Culvert	53.3053°N 1.1245°W	SK584790	
Site of Priory Mill	53.3044°N 1.1167°W	SK589789	
Kilton Aqueduct	53.3043°N 1.1043°W	SK597789	Chesterfield Canal
Railway viaduct	53.3025°N 1.0863°W	SK609787	Sheffield to Lincoln Line
Chequer Bridge Ranby	53.3271°N 1.0320°W	SK645815	
Hodsock Red Bridge	53.3611°N 1.0668°W	SK622853	
Blyth New Bridge	53.3782°N 1.0737°W	SK617872	Grade I listed
Whitewater Common drainage	53.3935°N 1.0560°W	SK628889	
Mouth	53.4218°N 1.0121°W	SK657921	Junction with R Idle

== Bibliography ==
- CAMS (2006). The Idle and Torne Catchment Abstraction Management Strategy (PDF). Environment Agency. Archived from the original (PDF) on 15 January 2018.
- Jackson, M. J. (1969). "Worksop of Yesterday". The Worksop Archaeological and Local Historical Society. Archived from the original on 23 July 2018.
- Jackson, M. J. (1979). Worksop in Times Past. Countryside Publications. ISBN 978-0-86157-023-2.
- Marsh, T. J.; Hannaford, J. (2008). UK Hydrometric Register. Hydrological data UK series (PDF). Centre for Ecology & Hydrology. Archived from the original (PDF) on 31 October 2014.
- Roffey, James (1989). Chesterfield Canal. Barracuda Books Ltd. ISBN 978-0-86023-461-6.
