= Langold =

Coordinates: 53.378°N 1.123°W

- Village
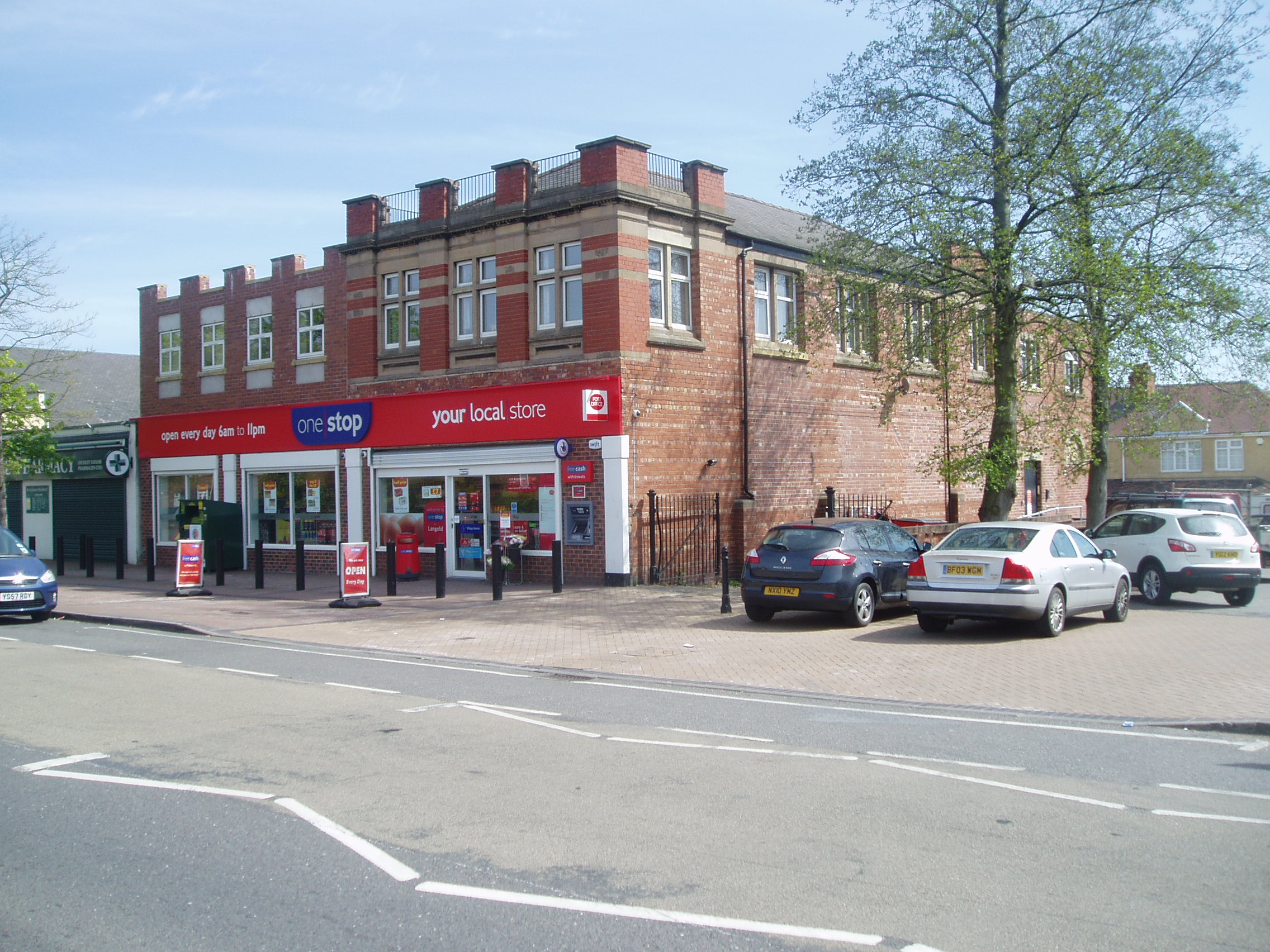
- The One Stop Shop, which was originally the Co-op when it opened in 1925. The upstairs was used as a school, Sunday school and dancehall.

- Location within Nottinghamshire
- Population: 2,472 (Ward. 2011)
- OS grid reference: SK584871
- Civil parish: Hodsock
- District: Bassetlaw
- Shire county: Nottinghamshire
- Region: East Midlands
- Country: England
- Sovereign state: United Kingdom
- Post town: WORKSOP
- Postcode district: S81
- Dialling code: 01909
- Police: Nottinghamshire
- Fire: Nottinghamshire
- Ambulance: East Midlands
- UK Parliament: Bassetlaw
- Website: https://www.hodsock-pc.gov.uk/community/hodsock-parish-council-10633/home/

Langold is a village in the civil parish of Hodsock, in the Bassetlaw district, north Nottinghamshire, England. At the 2011 census it was defined as a ward of Bassetlaw Council with a population of 2,472.

== History ==
While there are references to settlement in the geographical area which is now Langold from 1246, before the early twentieth century it consisted of farmland and parkland in the estates of Firbeck and Hodsock. Hodsock Priory and estate with its farms, and much of Carlton-in-Lindrick were bought by the Mellish family in 1765, parts of which they sold on to Ralph Knight of Langold. Knight created plantations and a series of ponds and lakes in Langold Park, and intended to build a mansion, but although he had built stables and a small Palladian house, little work had been done on the mansion when he died at the age of 56 in 1768.

Ralph Knight was unmarried, and so the estate passed via his sister to his nephew, John Gally Knight, while another nephew, Henry, lived at Firbeck Hall. Both estates passed to Henry's son, also called Henry, who again planned a large mansion overlooking the lake, but although he commissioned Sir Jeffry Wyatt to draw up plans, no construction took place. Knight made some changes to the estate, most notably the conversion of the existing ponds and lakes into two inter-connected lakes, for which the work was completed in 1818. The lakes were separated by a weir with an arched bridge over a boathouse by the 1890s. Langold Hall was described as "a farmhouse" in William White's gazetteer of 1838. The Langold estate passed to Sir Thomas Wollaston White in 1846 and to Sir Archibald Wollaston White of Wallingwells in 1907. It consisted of a farm and the hall, situated close to the Worksop to Tickhill turnpike road, which had been constructed in 1767. Wollaston White sold the Langold estate to Thomas Place of Northallerton in early 1927, once coal had been found, and Place sold it to the Firbeck Colliery Company in July 1927.

=== Firbeck Colliery ===
It was built to provide housing for the miners of Firbeck Colliery between 1923 and 1927. By 1911, mining in the area suggested that there may be a workable seam of coal at Langold. The Wallingwells Boring Company was created, and German engineers carried out some test drilling in a field which was part of Costhorpe Farm. Although the initial tests were good, the First World War brought a stop to the work. The Firbeck Light Railway was authorised in 1916, but no further development took place until 1923.

A further survey of the potential coal reserves took place in May 1923, and sinking of the No. 1 Shaft began on 16 July, with construction of the No. 2 Shaft following on 15 August. Each shaft was cemented for the first 390 feet (120 m) to prevent water entering it. Work stopped at 450 yards (410 m), when water flooded the workings, and pumps had to be installed. In mid 1925, the shafts reached the Barnsley coal seam, at a depth of 828 yards (757 m), and the seam continued downwards for another 28 yards (26 m). The headgear for the shafts was completed by late 1923, and a 180-foot (55 m) chimney was constructed in under 13 weeks. Six boilers supplied steam for the winding engines, and a Baume washer capable of washing 160 tons of coal per hour was installed.

Access to the colliery site was provided by around 5 miles (8.0 km) of temporary railway track, laid to connect to the main railway network which served Harworth Colliery. This opened on 7 April 1924, and was upgraded to permanent track, with the new system opening on 1 October 1927. The colliery was called Firbeck colliery, although the village of the same name is located more than 2 miles (3.2 km) to the north west of the village of Langold.

Mining was a hard physical task, with the miners required to provide their own pickaxes and shovels. Even sharpening of a pick blade had to be paid for out of the miner's wages. Coal was moved from the coal face to the shaft in tubs, pulled along rails by ponies. There were about 200 ponies employed in the mine, with about half below ground at any time, while the other half occupied the fields around Langold Lake. Conditions improved with the opening of the pit baths in 1933, although there were some men who would not use them because there was a charge of 6d (2.5 pence) per week, deducted from the miner's pay.

The mine produced coal for the industrial markets, supplying coking coal, gas coal, manufacturing coal and steam coal. Shortly after opening, it was affected by the miners strike of 1926, but production resumed afterwards. By 1938 the colliery was owned by Firbeck Main Collieries Ltd of Chesterfield, who employed 1,457 underground workers and 357 surface workers. After nationalisation in 1946, it became part of the National Coal Board's No.1 Worksop area. At its peak in 1953, the mine employed 1,448 underground workers and 393 surface workers. Problems gradually occurred, as the mine was affected by water, ventilation difficulties and geological faults. Transport of the coal to the surface was slow, as the shafts were unsuitable for the installation of mechanical skip winding, and by 1968, the mine was deemed to be uneconomical. It closed on 31 December 1968, and many of the miners moved to other local pits at Maltby, Manton, Shireoaks and Steetley.

=== The Village ===
Construction of housing began to the west of the main road in 1924, with 128 houses completed and occupied by April 1925. In less than five years, a village consisting of 850 houses, six shops and a school had been built to the north of the pit to house the workers, many of whom were brought from the coal mining areas of the North East of England.

Shops and stalls started to appear almost as soon as people moved into the village, selling provisions to those sinking the shafts. Many of the shops were built on the eastern side of Doncaster Road, although there were others scattered throughout the village. The Worksop Co-operative Society arrived in 1925, and their large shop had an upstairs room, which was used as a school room and Sunday school during the day and a dance hall at night. Two banks operated part-time in the village, and two cinemas opened in 1927. In the same year, the Langold Hotel was opened, to the north of the village, promoted by the Colliery Company as a place where engineers and visiting officials could stay. The hotel had six guest rooms, but they were not used much after the first few years. The Hill Top Club was constructed near to the shops on Doncaster Road, using the huts which were no longer required by the building contractors.

The first school in the village was an iron building, originally constructed in 1906 in Forest Town near Mansfield Woodhouse and moved in 1924. It housed 120 pupils, and a further 100 were housed in a corrugated iron extension added in 1925. Soon, 70 children were taken to Carlton-in-Lindrick each day, and 90 infants were taught in the room above the Co-op. The first five classrooms in a permanent school were available from 1 September 1926, and the "Tin School" was abandoned in January 1927 when the new school was completed. An infant school was built on the same site, and was completed by September 1928. The infant school catered for 388 children, the junior school 360, and the senior school 384, although some pupils went to one of the Retford schools if they passed their 11+ examination. The older school, or "Tin School", as it was and is popularly referred to in the village and surrounding areas, was partially demolished between 2003 and 2004, and fully gone by 2007.

=== Langold Lakes ===
Langold Lakes Country Park is situated on the south-western edge of the village.

Knight's lakes provided leisure facilities for the miners once the village had been built. The principal activity was fishing. Following the nationalisation of the coal industry in 1946, the National Coal Board became responsible for the park, and made improvements to the leisure facilities. A bandstand was added in 1946 and a lido in the early 1950s. The south lawn was gradually covered by spoil from the mine, and now towers some 265 feet (81 m) over the park. Ownership passed to the local authority after the pit closed in 1968, who built children's playgrounds and refreshment facilities once the mining equipment had been removed. In 1975, the dam and some of the banking at the eastern end of the main lake were reconstructed. Following years of neglect, the lido was removed and the bandstand refurbished in 2013, while new play equipment was added in 2014.

Management of the lakes was made easier in 1992, when the Local Government Boundary Commission for England reviewed the boundaries for the Metropolitan Borough of Rotherham. Prior to 1992, the eastern half of the main lake was in Nottinghamshire, and the western half was in Rotherham. The councils for Nottinghamshire, Bassetlaw and Rotherham all agreed to moving the boundary, so that it followed recognisable features in the landscape. To the north, it was re-routed along the southern edge of Crow Wood, and to the south-west, it followed the eastern edge of the woods at Langold Holt. As a result, both of the lakes and land to the north and south of them became part of Nottinghamshire.

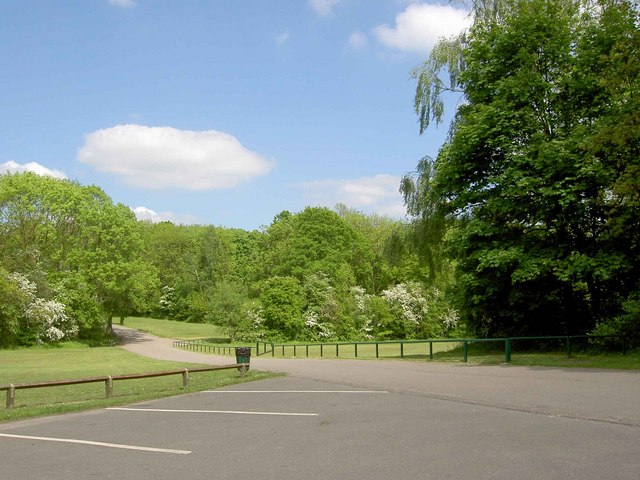
Langold Lakes today

== Politics ==
Langold, in the Bassetlaw constituency, is represented in the House of Commons by Jo White, Labour. Between 1935 and 2019 it had been a Labour seat. The last Labour MP was backbencher John Mann, who was elected in 2001, following the retirement of Joe Ashton, who in turn took over from Fred Bellenger, at a by-election in 1968.

== Today ==
Langold is a thriving community, which has been expanded with the addition of new houses and shops. Langold Lakes, which were originally built by the Gally Knight family, now form part of a Country Park, which includes recreational areas, walks and wildlife habitats. A survey revealed at least seven species of bats within the park. The lakes are well stocked with tench, bream and roach, and regular fishing matches take place there. The village is overshadowed by Firbeck Pit tip, where the spoil was dumped, and the derelict mine buildings still stand to the south of the village. The village school was recently named 'best in Worksop' and the lively church housed in the old cinema continues to run many activities for young people, children and residents of Langold.

As a 'model village' similar to Creswell (Derbyshire) and Manton (Worksop), Langold village contains numerous features of architectural and historical interest. Of particular note is the foundation stone of St Lukes Church on Church Street inscribed "To the glory of God. This stone was laid by Miss Mellish 25 June 1928". Also of interest are the four brick and tile entrance piers on Wembley Road, the piers built and road named as such in 1924 to commemorate the first FA Cup Final to be held at Wembley Stadium the previous year.

== Bibliography ==
- BDC, upg30 (2015). "UPG30 Langold Park" (PDF). Bassetlaw District Council. Archived (PDF) from the original on 10 June 2017.
- Ennals, K. F. J.; et al. (16 July 1992). The Metropolitan Borough of Rotherham (PDF). Local Government Boundary Commission for England.
- Library (1995). A look back at Langold. Nottinghamshire County Council, Community Services. (compiled from material held in Langold Library, with additional information from others)
- Wain, Ken (2014). The Coal Mining Industry of Barnsley, Rotherham and Worksop. Amberley Publishing. ISBN 978-1-4456-3965-9.

=== References ===
- The geographic coordinates are from the Ordnance Survey.
