= List of places of interest in Nottinghamshire =

This is a list of places of interest in the British county of Nottinghamshire. See List of places in Nottinghamshire for a list of settlements in Nottinghamshire.

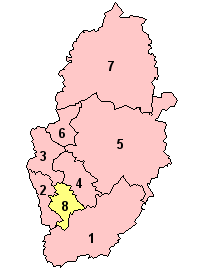
1 Rushcliffe, 2 Broxtowe, 3 Ashfield, 4 Gedling, 5 Newark and Sherwood, 6 Mansfield, 7 Bassetlaw, 8 Nottingham.

== Ashfield ==
Name	Image	Location	Type	Description	Notes
Annesley Old Church		Annesley	Church	Medieval church built in 1356 by the Annesley family.	Grade I listed building Scheduled Ancient Monument

== Bassetlaw ==
Name	Image	Location	Type	Description	Notes
Chesterfield Canal		West Stockwith	Canal	Shared with Derbyshire and South Yorkshire; 46 mile-long canal, built in 1777, running 46 miles from West Stockwith to Chesterfield.	Site of Special Scientific Interest
Clumber Park		The Dukeries	Country park	Former seat of the Earl of Lincoln.	Site of Special Scientific Interest; National Trust property
Creswell Crags		Cresswell	Gorge	Shared with Derbyshire; Limestone gorge containing the northernmost cave art in Europe.	Site of Special Scientific Interest
Idle Valley Nature Reserve		Retford	Nature reserve		Site of Special Scientific Interest
Mattersey Priory		Mattersey	Priory		English Heritage property
Mr Straw's House		Worksop	Historic House	Edwardian house built in 1905 with an interior that has remained largely unchanged since the 1920s.	National Trust property
River Idle		Markham Moor	River	26 mile-long river running from Markham Moor to Misterton.	Site of Special Scientific Interest
Serlby Hall		Blyth	Country house	18th century Country house built in 1740 by James Paine for John Monckton, 1st Viscount Galway.	Grade I listed building
St. Mary and St. Martin's Church		Blyth	Church	Medieval church built in 1088, with a priory that is one of the oldest examples of Norman architecture in the country.	Grade I listed building
St. Peter's Church		Clayworth	Church	11th century church with parts dating from a substantial restoration by John Oldrid Scott in 1874.	Grade I listed building

=== Other ===
- All Saints' Church, Babworth
- Church of St. John the Baptist, East Markham
- Church of St. Mary the Virgin, Clumber Park
- St Peter's Church, East Drayton
- Harley Gallery and Foundation
- St Giles' Church, Elkesley
- St Gregory's Church, Fledborough
- St John the Evangelist's Church, Carlton in Lindrick
- St Mary's Church, Norton Cuckney
- St Oswald's Church, Dunham-on-Trent
- St. Peter's Church, Headon-cum-Upton

== Broxtowe ==
Name	Image	Location	Type	Description	Notes
Attenborough Nature Reserve		Attenborough	Nature reserve		Site of Special Scientific Interest
D. H. Lawrence Birthplace Museum		Museum	Eastwood	Museum dedicated to the life of D. H. Lawrence.	
Durban House Heritage Centre		Museum	Eastwood	Museum dedicated to the history of Eastwood.	

== Gedling ==
Name	Image	Location	Type	Description	Notes
Newstead Abbey		Newstead	Priory	Augustinian priory founded in 1170, best known as the home of Lord Byron.	Grade I listed building
Papplewick Pumping Station		Papplewick	Pumping station	Victorian pumping station built in 1881 to provide water for the city of Nottingham.	Grade II* listed building Scheduled Ancient Monument

== Mansfield ==
=== Other ===
- Mansfield Museum

== Newark and Sherwood ==
Name	Image	Location	Type	Description	Notes
British Horological Institute		Upton	Museum		
Newark Air Museum		Winthorpe	Museum		
Newark Castle		Newark-on-Trent	Castle		Grade I listed building
Rufford Abbey		Rufford	Abbey		English Heritage property
The Workhouse		Southwell	Museum		National Trust property

=== Other ===
- Beth Shalom Holocaust Centre

== Nottingham ==
Name	Image	Location	Type	Description	Notes
Colwick Cutting		Sneinton	Woodland		Site of Special Scientific Interest
Galleries of Justice Museum		Nottingham	Museum		
Green's Mill		Sneinton	Windmill		Grade II listed building
Nottingham Castle		Nottingham	Castle		Grade I listed building
Nottingham Contemporary		Nottingham	Museum		
Nottingham Transport Heritage Centre		Ruddington	Museum	Museum dedicated to transport, housed in the northern terminus of the Great Central Railway.	
Wollaton Hall		Nottingham	Country house	Elizabethan country house built in 1580, now a museum dedicated to natural history.	Grade I listed building

=== Other ===
- National Videogame Arcade
- Seller's Wood
- Wilwell Farm Nature Reserve

== Rushcliffe ==
Name	Image	Location	Type	Description	Notes
Holme Pierrepont Hall		Holme Pierrepont	Historic House		Grade I listed building
