= List of Sites of Special Scientific Interest in Nottinghamshire =

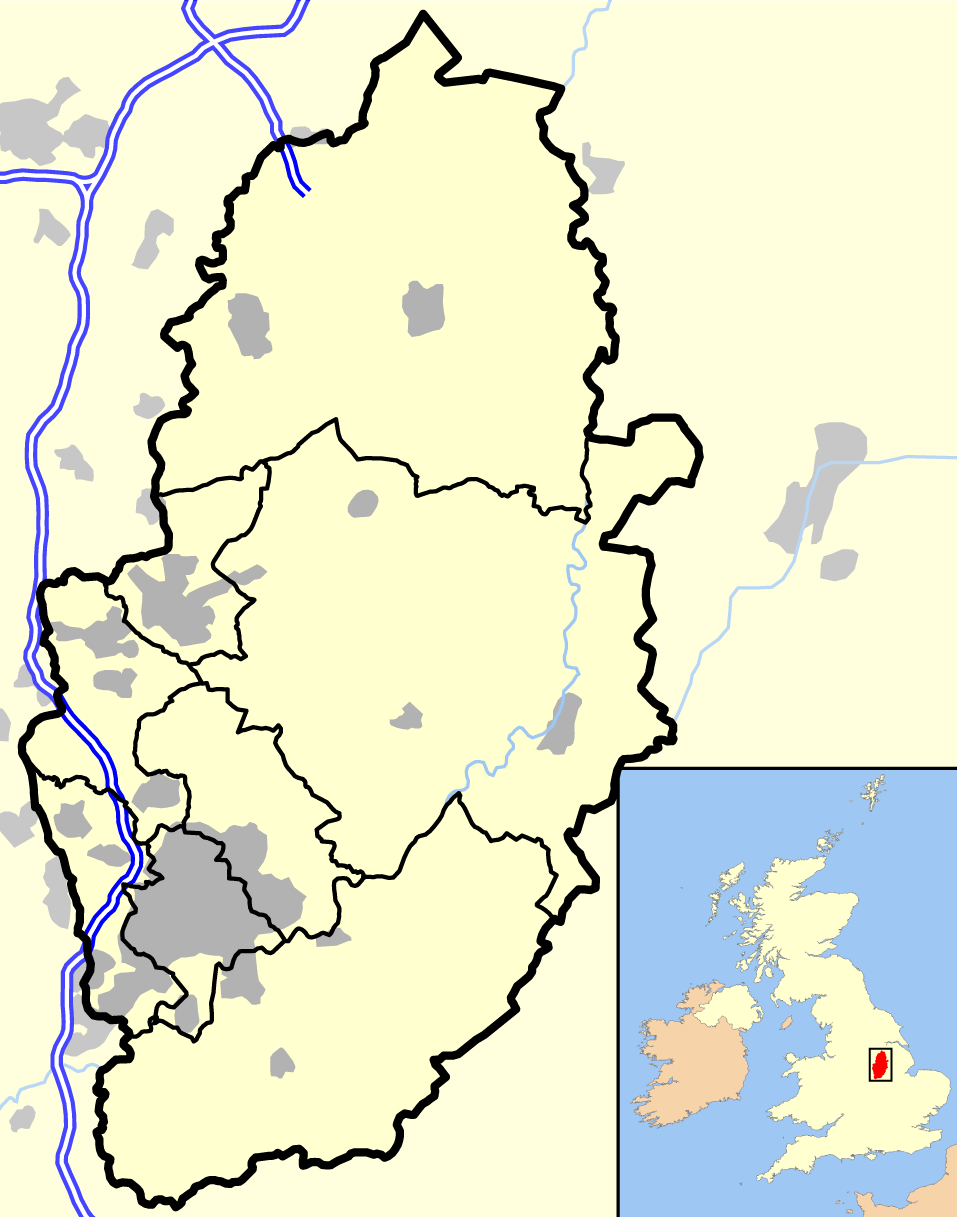
Nottinghamshire, and its location within the United Kingdom

This is a list of Sites of Special Scientific Interest (SSSIs) in Nottinghamshire, a county in the East Midlands. Nottinghamshire is bordered by South Yorkshire to the north, and Leicestershire to the south, and has an estimated population of 1,055,400 within an area of 2,159 km^{2} (833.6 sq mi), therefore making it the 17th largest ceremonial county in the United Kingdom. The data in this table is taken from English Nature's website in the form of citation sheets for each SSSI.

As of March 2012 there are 66 SSSIs in Nottinghamshire. 63 are notable for their biological interest, 1 for its geology and 2 for both geological and biological interest.

For other counties, see List of SSSIs by Area of Search.

== Sites ==
Site name	Reason for designation		Area		Location & map ref	Other designations	Map/Refs
Site name	Biological interest	Geological interest	Hectares	Acres	Location & map ref	Other designations	Map/Refs
Annesley Woodhouse Quarry	✓		34.6	85.5	53.078°N 1.276°W; SK486537	WT	Map
Ashton's Meadow	✓		3.6	8.8	53.31°N 0.822°W; SK786799		Map
Attenborough Gravel Pits	✓		226.6	559.9	52.899°N 1.228°W; SK520338	WT	Map
Bagthorpe Meadows	✓		6.3	15.6	53.062°N 1.302°W; SK469519		Map
Barnstone Railway Cutting	✓		1.5	3.8	52.912°N 0.901°W; SK740355		Map
Barrow Hills Sandpit	✓		1.9	4.6	53.418°N 0.975°W; SK682917		Map
Besthorpe Meadows	✓		9.3	23.1	53.168°N 0.778°W; SK818641		Map
Besthorpe Warren	✓		8.8	21.8	53.179°N 0.763°W; SK828654		Map
Bevercotes Park	✓		8.5	21.1	53.231°N 0.953°W; SK700709		Map
Birklands And Bilhaugh	✓		505.7	1249.7	53.208°N 1.078°W; SK617683	CP, NNR, NCR, SAC	Map
Birklands West And Ollerton Corner	✓		414.6	1024.6	53.199°N 1.105°W; SK599673	LNR	Map
Bogs Farm Quarry	✓		4.9	12	53.076°N 1.283°W; SK481534		Map
Bulwell Wood	✓		16.8	41.5	53.011°N 1.231°W; SK517462		Map
Castle Hill Wood	✓		30.4	75.1	53.315°N 0.895°W; SK737804		Map
Chesterfield Canal	✓		29.8	73.7	53.368°N 0.9°W; SK733863		Map
Clarborough Tunnel	✓		8.5	21.1	53.335°N 0.875°W; SK750826	WT	Map
Clipstone Heath	✓		4.2	10.4	53.156°N 1.113°W; SK594625		Map
Clumber Park	✓		525.7	1298.9	53.258°N 1.062°W; SK627739	NT	Map
Colwick Cutting	✓	✓	2.1	5.1	52.952°N 1.104°W; SK603398	GCR, LNR	Map
Dovedale Wood	✓		13.4	33.2	53.163°N 1.306°W; SK465631	NT	Map
Dyscarr Wood	✓		21.6	53.4	53.382°N 1.131°W; SK579876	WT	Map
Eakring And Maplebeck Meadows	✓		15.8	39	53.151°N 0.952°W; SK702621	WT	Map
Friezeland Grassland	✓		3.7	9.1	53.051°N 1.291°W; SK476506		Map
Gamston & Eaton Woods & Roadside Verges	✓		57.2	141.2	53.286°N 0.912°W; SK726771	WT	Map
Gotham Hill Pasture	✓		8.4	20.8	52.872°N 1.214°W; SK530308		Map
Hills And Holes And Sookholme Brook, Warsop	✓		30.2	74.5	53.204°N 1.171°W; SK555678	WES	Map
Holme Pit	✓		4.2	10.3	52.905°N 1.205°W; SK536345		Map
Kimberley Railway Cutting	✓	✓	5.4	13.3	53.001°N 1.256°W; SK500451	GCR, WT	Map
Kinoulton Marsh And Canal	✓		2.6	6.4	52.867°N 0.994°W; SK678304		Map
Kirkby Grives	✓		22	54.4	53.092°N 1.258°W; SK498552	LNR, WT	Map
Kirton Wood, Notts.	✓		18.4	45.5	53.207°N 0.943°W; SK707683	WT	Map
Laxton Sykes	✓		14.3	35.3	53.182°N 0.906°W; SK732656		Map
Linby Quarries	✓		38.7	95.6	53.064°N 1.205°W; SK534522		Map
Lord Stubbins Wood	✓		24.8	61.4	53.215°N 1.196°W; SK538690		Map
Mather Wood	✓		8	19.7	53.125°N 0.921°W; SK723592		Map
Mattersey Hill Marsh	✓		6	14.9	53.378°N 0.993°W; SK671873		Map
Misson Line Bank	✓		20.7	51.2	53.457°N 0.925°W; SK715961		Map
Misson Training Area	✓		85.2	210.5	53.469°N 0.926°W; SK714974	WT	Map
Mother Drain, Misterton	✓		3.6	9	53.447°N 0.832°W; SK777951		Map
Newhall Reservoir Meadow	✓		0.7	1.8	53.085°N 1.015°W; SK661546		Map
Normanton Pastures	✓		16.6	40.9	52.892°N 1.072°W; SK625331		Map
Orston Plaster Pits	✓		4.6	11.5	52.953°N 0.867°W; SK762401		Map
Pleasley Vale Railway	✓		3.5	8.7	53.178°N 1.223°W; SK520648	LNR	Map
Rainworth Heath	✓		13.6	33.7	53.126°N 1.118°W; SK591591		Map
Rainworth Lakes	✓		14.2	35	53.117°N 1.127°W; SK585581		Map
Redgate Woods And Mansey Common	✓		71.3	176.1	53.132°N 0.987°W; SK679599		Map
River Idle Washlands	✓		88.5	218.6	53.436°N 1.003°W; SK663937	WT	Map
Robbinetts	✓		6.3	15.5	52.973°N 1.269°W; SK492420		Map
Roe Wood	✓		46.7	115.5	53.123°N 0.958°W; SK698589		Map
Rushcliffe Golf Course	✓		19.5	48.1	52.848°N 1.195°W; SK543281		Map
Scrooby Top Quarry	✓		3.6	8.8	53.395°N 1.024°W; SK650891		Map
Seller's Wood	✓		13.9	34.3	53.003°N 1.224°W; SK522454	LNR	Map
Sherwood Forest Golf Course	✓		62.5	154.5	53.149°N 1.124°W; SK587617		Map
Sledder Wood Meadows	✓		7.9	19.6	53.017°N 1.261°W; SK497469		Map
Spalford Warren	✓		35.8	88.5	53.203°N 0.756°W; SK832680	WT	Map
Strawberry Hill Heaths	✓		31.5	77.9	53.137°N 1.136°W; SK579603		Map
Styrrup Quarry		✓	0.3	0.7	53.405°N 1.091°W; SK605902	GCR	Map
Sutton And Lound Gravel Pits	✓		316.8	782.8	53.369°N 0.937°W; SK708863	WT	Map
Teversal Pastures	✓		17.9	44.3	53.15°N 1.267°W; SK491617	LNR	Map
Teversal To Pleasley Railway	✓		5	12.4	53.165°N 1.272°W; SK488633	LNR, WT	Map
Thoresby Lake	✓		58	143.3	53.227°N 1.055°W; SK632704		Map
Treswell Wood	✓		48	118.6	53.306°N 0.859°W; SK761794	WT	Map
Welbeck Lake	✓		101.7	251.2	53.249°N 1.144°W; SK572728	Wildlife refuge	Map
Wellow Park	✓		135.5	334.8	53.197°N 0.978°W; SK684671		Map
Wilford Claypits	✓		2.2	5.4	52.914°N 1.154°W; SK570355		Map
Wilwell Cutting	✓		7.3	18.1	52.908°N 1.16°W; SK566348	LNR, WT	Map

== See also ==
- List of SSSIs by Area of Search

== Notes ==
^{A} Data rounded to one decimal place.
^{B} Grid reference is based on the British national grid reference system, also known as OSGB36, and is the system used by the Ordnance Survey.
^{C} Those SSSIs with more than one OS grid reference are composed of multiple sections, separated by non-SSSI land.
^{E} Link to maps using the Nature on the Map service provided by Natural England.
