= Blyth Priory =

Priory in Nottinghamshire, England

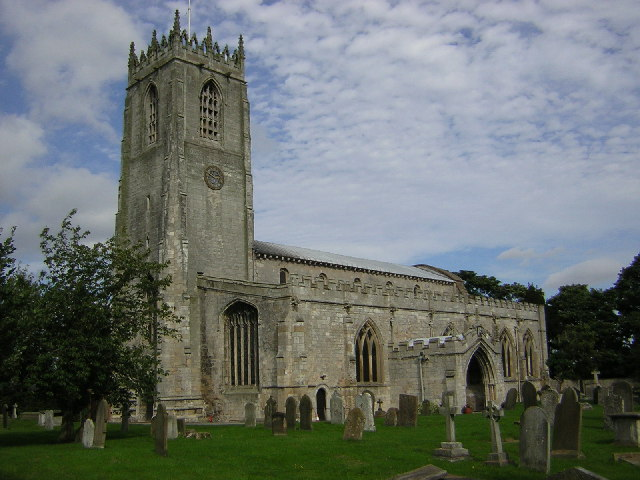
- Blyth Church, which incorporates part of the former priory church

- Location within Nottinghamshire
- Interactive map of Blyth Priory

Monastery information
- Order: Benedictine
- Established: 1088. Refounded in 1409.
- Disestablished: 1409 and 1536
- Mother house: Until 1409, St. Katharine's, Rouen, France

People
- Founder: Roger de Builli

Site
- Location: Nottinghamshire, England
- Coordinates: 53.3788262°N 1.0634583°W
- Visible remains: Part of the Priory Church incorporated in St. Mary and St. Martin’s Church, Blyth

Blyth Priory was a priory in Nottinghamshire, England, dedicated to St Mary the Virgin.

== History ==
Blyth Priory was founded in 1088 by Roger de Busli, as a house of Benedictine Monks. It was an alien house (one dependent on a foreign mother-house), being an offshoot of St Katherine's Abbey in Rouen, France (also known as Holy Trinity Abbey, or St Katherine's on the Mount). As an alien priory, when England was at war with France, control of the priory passed to the King. And as a daughter house of St. Katharine's at Rouen, its priors were long appointed by that house and many of the monks were Frenchmen, sent hither, it was reputed, by way of punishment. They fared ill from cold and wet, and an archbishop suggested that five years should therefore be the limit of their stay. Under lax rule they were troublesome, and the prior at Rouen was invited to send no more unless they were more orderly. It has been suggested that the priory was established with a view of its brethren ministering to those wounded in the jousts and performing the last rites to such as died, but this is open to question inasmuch as it was not until more than a century after its foundation that the tournament field was licensed. It is possible, however, that as Norman knights were fond of jousting there may have been knightly contests here in de Busli's lifetime.

The original priory was dissolved in 1409. It was, however, refounded shortly afterwards as an independent priory, no longer dependent upon a French (or any other) mother-house. The priory was dissolved again in 1536 as part of King Henry VIII's Dissolution of the Monasteries.

== Architecture and remains ==
The priory church was constructed in the late 11th century, shortly after the monastery was founded in 1088. It was however, altered in the 13th and 14th century. In the 15th century the transepts and 5 apses of the priory church were blocked off, before being demolished in the mid-16th century. The western tower was also added in the 15th century. The south aisle of the priory church had been used for parochial use from the 13th century, and following the Dissolution, the remains of the priory church were reused to create the parish church, St. Mary and St. Martin’s Church, Blyth. The church was altered and restored again in both the 19th and 20th centuries.

The monastery buildings lay on the north side, separated from the church by the cloisters and garth, or open area. Following Dissolution, the eastern end of the church, and the monastic buildings to the north of the cloisters fell into ruins and were never repaired. After a century in ruins the other monastic buildings were renovated to create a private residence. The house was, however, completely demolished by Edward Mellish around 1670. Mellish constructed a new house he called Blyth Hall. The only section of the priory incorporated into this new house was the cellar. By 1951 the hall was described as "derelict" and was finally demolished in the 1970s, along with the last fragment of the monastic buildings. The site, though a scheduled monument, is now occupied by a housing estate.

== Priors of Blyth Priory ==
List of Priors of Blyth:

- R. de Pauliaco, 1188
- William Wastell, 12—
- Gilbert, occurs 1224
- Theobald, occurs 1260
- William Burdon, 1273, resigned 1303
- Nicholas de Bretteville, elected 1303
- Robert de Clyvill, 1310
- Ralph de Toto, 1328
- Peter Meslier, resigned 1344
- Peter Textor, 1344
- Gilbert, occurs 1365
- Thomas de Vymond, resigned 1376
- Nicholas English, 1376
- William Ouston, 1409
- John Halum, died 1420
- Robert Clifforth, 1420
- John Gaynesbury, 1421
- Robert Toppeclyff, 1429
- John Cotyngham, 1431
- Nicholas Halle, 1438
- Thomas Bolton, 1448
- William West, 1451-8
- Robert Bubwith, 1458
- Robert Scotis, 1465
- William Massam, died 1472
- Robert Gwyllam, 1496
- Thomas Gardiner, 1507
- John Baynebrig, 1511
- George Dalton, 1534

== See also ==
- St. Mary and St. Martin’s Church, Blyth
