= List of museums in Nottinghamshire =

This list of museums in Nottinghamshire, England contains museums which are defined for this context as institutions (including nonprofit organizations, government entities, and private businesses) that collect and care for objects of cultural, artistic, scientific, or historical interest and make their collections or related exhibits available for public viewing. Also included are non-profit art galleries and university art galleries. Museums that exist only in cyberspace (i.e., virtual museums) are not included.

Name	Image	Town/City	Region	Type	Summary
Bassetlaw Museum		Retford	Bassetlaw	Local	local history, art, archaeology, decorative arts, agriculture, costume and textiles, industry, rural life, coal mining
Beth Shalom Holocaust Centre		Laxton	Newark and Sherwood	History	History of the Holocaust and other 20th-century genocides
Bilsthorpe Heritage Museum		Bilsthorpe	Newark and Sherwood	Local	Coal mining
British Horological Institute		Upton	Newark and Sherwood	Horology	Located at Upton Hall, collection of historic clocks, watches, tools and other horological artifacts, open on special occasions to non-members
Calverton Folk Museum		Calverton	Gedling	Local	Period furniture and clothing, fossils, framework knitting history, Victorian kitchen, living room and bedroom
Creswell Crags		Creswell	Bassetlaw	Archaeology	Limestone gorge and caves with flint tools and other Stone Age artifacts
D. H. Lawrence Birthplace Museum		Eastwood	Broxtowe	Historic house	19th century working class house, birthplace of author D. H. Lawrence
Dukes Wood Oil Museum		Eakring	Newark and Sherwood	Industry	site and story of the UK’s first oilfield
Durban House Heritage Centre		Eastwood	Broxtowe	Multiple	Includes late 19th century social history exhibits and context of author D. H. Lawrence's life in town, also an art gallery
Flintham Museum		Flintham	Newark and Sherwood	History	20th century period shop reflecting rural life
Framework Knitters Museum		Ruddington	Rushcliffe	Industry	complex of restored Victorian period frameshops, cottages and outbuildings that show the living and working conditions of framework knitters
Galleries of Justice Museum		Nottingham	Nottingham	Prison	Historic courthouse and gaol
Green's Windmill and Science Centre		Sneinton	Nottingham	Multiple	Restored and working 19th-century tower windmill, hands-on science exhibits
Harley Gallery		Welbeck	Bassetlaw	Art	Located at Welbeck Abbey, features contemporary arts and crafts
Holme Pierrepont Hall		Holme Pierrepont	Rushcliffe	Historic house	Medieval hall and garden, open to the public on a limited basis
Lakeside Arts Centre		Nottingham	Nottingham	Art	performing and visual arts centre of the University of Nottingham
Mansfield Museum		Mansfield	Mansfield	Multiple	Art, local history, culture
Mr Straw's House		Worksop	Bassetlaw	Historic house	Operated by the National Trust, 1920s period family house
Museum of Nottingham Life at Brewhouse Yard		Nottingham	Nottingham	History	local social history, period room and shop settings, reconstructed Victorian schoolroom, wartime life
Museum of The Horse		Tuxford	Bassetlaw	History	walk through 2000 years of equestrian history
National Civil War Centre - Newark Museum		Newark-on-Trent	Newark and Sherwood	History	focuses solely on the British Civil War
National Videogame Arcade		Nottingham	Nottingham	Amusement	Historic videogames, history of British videogame culture
New Art Exchange		Nottingham	Nottingham	Art	visual art gallery for culturally diverse contemporary artists
Newark Air Museum		Newark-on-Trent	Newark and Sherwood	Aviation	Located on part of the former World War II airfield of Winthorpe, historic civilian and military aircraft
Newark Castle & Gilstrap Heritage Centre		Newark-on-Trent	Newark and Sherwood	History	Ruins of the medieval castle, exhibits about the castle's history and Newark's Civil War heritage
Newark Town Hall Museum & Art Gallery		Newark-on-Trent	Newark and Sherwood	Art	collection of paintings, furniture, ceremonial silver and civic gifts
Newstead Abbey Historic House & Gardens		Ravenshead	Gedling	Historic house	Medieval house that was the ancestral home of Lord Byron, Victorian rooms
Nottingham Castle Museum		Nottingham	Nottingham	Multiple	Fine and decorative art, local history, archaeology, regimental museum of the Sherwood Foresters
Nottingham Contemporary		Nottingham	Nottingham	Art	Contemporary art centre
Nottingham Industrial Museum		Nottingham	Nottingham	Industry	Eclectic collection of regionally significant industrial objects, including steam and diesel engines
Nottingham Transport Heritage Centre		Ruddington	Rushcliffe	Transportation	Northern terminus of the Great Central Railway heritage railway, includes locomotives, carriages and stock, buses, road transport vehicles
Nottinghamshire Mining Museum		Mansfield	Mansfield	Local	Local coal mining history, situated within Mansfield railway station building
Papplewick Pumping Station		Papplewick	Gedling	Technology	Victorian water pumping station with steam engines
Ruddington Village Museum		Ruddington	Rushcliffe	History	recreated period shops, schoolroom, telephone exchange and farm implements
Tuxford Windmill		Tuxford	Bassetlaw	Mill	early 19th century windmill
Walks of Life		Tuxford	Bassetlaw	Agriculture	Collection of handcarts and hand-powered agricultural machinery
William Booth Birthplace Museum		Nottingham	Nottingham	Biographical	Birthplace home of William Booth, Methodist preacher who founded the Salvation Army
Wollaton Village Dovecote Museum		Wollaton	Nottingham	Local	17th century dovecote with local history exhibits
Wollaton Hall & Deer Park		Wollaton	Nottingham	Multiple	Includes the historic house, the Nottingham Natural History Museum, and Nottingham Industrial Museum with textile, transport and technology from Nottingham's past, including steam engines
The Workhouse		Southwell	Newark and Sherwood	History	Operated by the National Trust, 19th century workhouse

== Defunct museums ==
- Lace Centre, Nottingham, closed in 2009
- Longdale Craft Centre, Ravenshead
- Millgate Museum of Folk Life, Newark-on-Trent
- Newark Millgate Museum, closed in 2012
- Vina's Doll Gallery, Cromwell, closed in 2015

== See also ==
- Category:Tourist attractions in Nottinghamshire
