= Albert Sorby Buxton =

British painter and historian

Albert Sorby Buxton (1867–1932) was an English painter from Mansfield, Nottinghamshire. He was also a local historian, the town's antiquarian.

Sorby gave a collection of watercolours to Mansfield's art gallery. They captured the town of Mansfield at the turn of the 19th century and can be seen on permanent display at the Mansfield Museum.

== Notes ==
Artworks by or after Albert Sorby Buxton at the Art UK site
