= Thomas Woolston (architect) =

Thomas Woolston (15 June 1853 - 10 April 1938) was an architect and builder. He was born on 15 June 1853 in Stamford, Lincolnshire, the son of William Woolston (1807-1886) and Mary Jenkinson (1820-1896). He married Mary Hannah Durance (1851-1910) in St George's Church, Stamford on 28 December 1875. He died on 10 April 1938 at his home at 6 Ribble Road, Coventry, and was buried on 13 April 1938 in Beeston Cemetery.

== Works ==
His career began as a builder in Stamford in 1879 and for a period of around six months worked in partnership with his brother William.

During this time he built the Wisbech Post Office, and undertook restoration work on several churches including St Botoph's Church, Knottingley, St Mary and St Martin's Church, Blyth and Saltley church.

He sustained a serious injury on 6 August 1889. He was standing on the scaffold of a house near St Michael's Schools when the scaffolding collapsed and he fell from the height of two stories. The fall dislocated his shoulder and he suffered head injuries.

By 1892 he was declared bankrupt and had obtained employment as a foreman mason for Mr. Youngman, builder of Long Eaton.

He designed houses in Beeston around the turn of the 20th century and was the builder in the 1885 restoration of St Mary and St Martin's Church, Blyth.
