= Serlby Hall =

Mansion in Nottinghamshire, England

Coordinates: 53.40°N 1.05°W

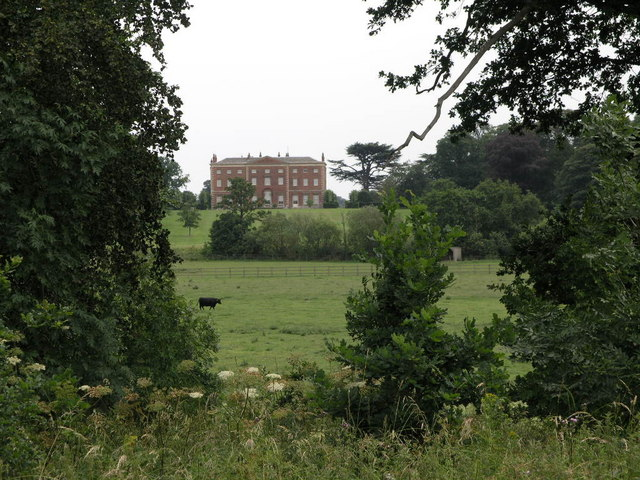

- Location within Nottinghamshire
- OS grid reference: SK635896
- District: Bassetlaw
- Shire county: Nottinghamshire
- Region: East Midlands
- Country: England
- Sovereign state: United Kingdom
- Post town: DONCASTER
- Postcode district: DN10
- Dialling code: 01777
- Police: Nottinghamshire
- Fire: Nottinghamshire
- Ambulance: East Midlands

Serlby Hall is a grade I listed 18th century mansion and estate in Nottinghamshire, England, located 7 miles north-east of Worksop.

It is constructed of red brick and ashlar with a hipped slate roof. It is built in two storeys with a nine bay frontage, which has a colonnaded portico.

== History ==
The first house on the site was built in 1740 by James Paine for John Monckton, 1st Viscount Galway, who had bought the 500 acre Serleby estate from the Saunderson family of Blyth. The 2nd Viscount William Monckton-Arundell inherited the estate in 1751, and replaced this house piecemeal, a process finished by the 3rd Viscount in 1773. The house was subsequently remodelled for the 5th Viscount in 1812 by William Lindley and John Woodhead, who demolished the wings and extended the central block by 2 bays on either side.

The house was an auxiliary military hospital during the First World War and a prisoner of war camp during the Second World War. Following the death of the 9th Viscount Galway in 1971, it was inherited by his only child Charlotte, who decided to sell the Hall. The remaining contents were sold at auction in 1978 and the Hall itself sold to a private owner in 1981.

== See also ==
- Grade I listed buildings in Nottinghamshire
- Listed buildings in Blyth, Nottinghamshire
