= Listed buildings in Blyth, Nottinghamshire =

Blyth is a civil parish in the Bassetlaw District of Nottinghamshire, England. The parish contains 53 listed buildings that are recorded in the National Heritage List for England. Of these, three are listed at Grade I, the highest of the three grades, and the others are at Grade II, the lowest grade. The parish contains the village of Blyth and the surrounding countryside. To the north of the village is the country house Serlby Hall, which is listed, together with associated structures around the house and in Serlby Park. The other listed buildings are in or around the village, and most of them are houses, cottages and associated structures, farmhouses and farm buildings. The other listed buildings include a church and items in the churchyard, a hotel and public houses, bridges, a milestone, a war memorial and a telephone kiosk.

== Key ==
Grade	Criteria
I	Buildings of exceptional interest, sometimes considered to be internationally important
II	Buildings of national importance and special interest

== Buildings ==
Name and location	Photograph	Date	Notes	Grade
St Mary and St Martin's Church; 53.37886°N 1.06344°W		Late 11th century	Originally a priory church, later a parish church, it has been altered and extended through the centuries, including a restoration in 1885 by C. Hodgson Fowler. It is built in stone and brick with lead roofs, and consists of a nave with a clerestory, north and south aisles, a south porch, north and south transepts, each with an east apsical chapel, a chancel with an apse, and a west tower. The tower has two stages, angle buttresses, a chamfered base, two moulded string courses, an arched west doorway with moulded jambs and a hood mould with a crocketed pinnacle, above which is a three-light window with a hood mould. The bell openings are arched and have a hood mould with gargoyles, and at the top is an embattled parapet with corner and central crocketed pinnacles.	I
St John's; 53.37470°N 1.06043°W		1446	A hospital that was rebuilt using earlier material, it was later used as a school and subsequently a private house, it is in stone on a chamfered plinth, with quoins, and a pantile roof with stone coped gables, kneelers and a finial. There is a single storey and an attic, and four bays. The doorway has a segmental arch, a 13th-century surround with dogtooth decoration on the jambs, and a hood mould. In the north front is a five-light mullioned window, elsewhere there are blocked mullioned windows and replacement casement windows, some with hood moulds.	II
Allendale, Clare Cottage, Ivy Cottage and Park Cottage; 53.37772°N 1.06293°W		Late 16th century	The cottages have a timber framed core, and were encased in red brick in about 1800. They have a pantile roof with a coped gable and kneelers on the right, and two storeys. Allendale, on the left, projects slightly, and has three bays, and an offset doorway with a gabled hood. The other cottages have two bays each and a central doorway. The windows are casements with arched Gothic cast iron glazing bars.	II
White House; 53.37669°N 1.06162°W		Late 16th century	The building has a timber framed core, and the exterior walls are in rendered stone and brick. It is on a plinth, and has quoins, a floor band, a moulded wooden cornice, and a pantile roof with a stone coped gable on the right. There are two storeys and attics, four bays, and a rear outshut. The doorway has a moulded surround, a frieze and a cornice, and the windows are sashes.	II
22 and 24/26 High Street; 53.37627°N 1.06182°W		17th century	Three cottages, later remodelled into two cottages, in red brick, with a hipped pantile roof and two storeys. No. 22 has two bays, a doorway with a fanlight, and an entablature over a bow window. No. 24/26 to the left is ed and has a floor band and three bays. The doorway is in the centre, and the windows are casements.	II
Park Farm House; 53.37538°N 1.06133°W		17th century	The house, which was altered in the 18th century, is in red brick on a stone plinth, with stone dressings, chamfered quoins, a floor band, a moulded cornice, and a hipped pantile roof. There are two storeys and three bays. The central doorway has a moulded surround and a segmental pediment, and the windows are sashes.	II
Rose and Crown Cottage and outbuildings 53.37671°N 1.05972°W		17th century	The public house has been altered and converted into living accommodation. It is in stone with timber framing and brick, and the main front faces south, away from the road. There are two storeys and three bays, with a later two-bay extension to the right. On the front is a doorway with a plain surround, over which is a dated plaque, and horizontally-sliding sash windows. To the right is a two-bay barn extension, later incorporated in the house, and projecting to the south is an eight-bay barn. The north front, facing the road, has five bays, it is stuccoed, and has applied timber framing.	II
The Homestead; 53.37758°N 1.06259°W		17th century	Two cottages combined into a house, it is in whitewashed rendered brick and stone, on a stone plinth, with possibly a timber framed core, and a hipped pantile roof. There are two storeys and five bays, and to the left is a recessed single-storey extension. The windows are casements.	II
1 and 2 Angel Row; 53.37847°N 1.06152°W		c. 1700	Two cottages in stuccoed stone with a pantile roof, hipped on the left. The front cottage has lintel bands, two storeys and three bays. In the centre is a doorway, and the windows are three-light mullioned casements. The cottage at the rear has two storeys and attics and three bays, and is on a plinth. The central doorway has a quoined surround, the windows are casements, and in the attic is a dormer with a horizontally-sliding sash.	II
1 and 2 Angel Cottage; 53.37802°N 1.06180°W		Early 18th century	A pair of mirror-image cottages in painted brick with a floor band, dentilled eaves, and a pantile roof with a coped gable on the right. There are two storeys and attics, and four bays. In the outer bays are doorways, and the windows are casements, all with segmental heads. In the roof are two gabled dormers with horizontally-sliding sashes.	II
Ginevers; 53.37771°N 1.06194°W		Early 18th century	A cottage and a shop in painted stucco with a pantile roof. There are two storeys and three bays. In the right bay is a shop window and a doorway, over which is an entablature on brackets. The middle bay contains a doorway with a rectangular fanlight, and the windows are sashes.	II
Fourways Hotel; 53.37738°N 1.06225°W		Early 18th century	The hotel is in painted brick on a plinth, with floor bands, and a pantile roof with stone coped gables and kneelers. There are two storeys and attics, three bays, and two rear wings. The middle bay projects slightly under a pediment, and it contains a doorway in a relieving arch, with a fanlight, a decorated panel, and a pediment on brackets. The windows are sashes.	II
High House and outbuildings 53.38361°N 1.06247°W	—	Early 18th century	The house is in painted rendered stone, and has a pantile roof with stone coped gables. There are two storeys and four bays. The doorway has a plain surround and a rectangular fanlight, and the windows are casements, those in the ground floor with mullions and transoms, and in the upper floor with mullions. At the rear is an outbuilding in painted brick with two storeys and five bays, and projecting from the left is a stone barn.	II
Ye Olde House; 53.37781°N 1.06190°W		Early 18th century	The house is stuccoed, and has floor bands, and a pantile roof with coped gables and kneelers. There are two storeys and attics, and three bays. In the ground floor is a central sash window, a canted bay window to the left, and a flat-headed carriage entrance to the right. In the upper floor are sash windows, and the attic contains fixed light windows. At the rear is a wing with two storeys and seven bays, on a plinth, with floor bands, and a doorway with an architrave and a hood on corbels.	II
Greystones; 53.37565°N 1.06055°W		18th century	The house, which was altered and refronted in the 19th century, is in stone and has a slate roof. There are two storeys, three bays, and rear wings with one and two storeys. In the centre is a porch with Doric pilasters, and a doorway with a fanlight. This is flanked by canted bay windows, and in the upper floor are sash windows.	II
Pigeoncote behind Greystones; 53.37579°N 1.06023°W	—	Mid 18th century	The pigeoncote, which was converted for residential use in 2016, is in red brick and stone on a stone plinth, and has dentilled eaves, and a pantile roof with crow-stepped gables, kneelers and ball finials. There are three storeys and an attic. In the ground floor is a doorway, steps lead up to a doorway in the middle floor, and in the attic are semicircular openings and a stone ledge.	II
Pigeoncote, Serlby Park; 53.39866°N 1.04636°W	—	Mid 18th century	The pigeoncote is in red brick with a floor band, dentilled eaves and a pantile roof. There are two storeys and five bays, and a recessed lean-to on the left. In the ground floor is a blocked doorway with a segmental head, other doorways and casement windows, and above are rectangular openings and ventilation holes in a diamond pattern.	II
The Angel Inn; 53.37827°N 1.06170°W		18th century	A coaching inn, later a public house, it is stuccoed, on a plinth, with a floor band, dogtooth and dentilled eaves, and a pantile roof with a coped gable and kneelers on the left. There are two storeys and ten bays, and rear extensions. The doorway has Tuscan half-columns, a fanlight and a segmental pediment. To the left and right of the doorway are canted bay windows, the other windows are sashes, and to the left is a flat-headed carriageway.	II
The Red Hart Hotel; 53.37756°N 1.06198°W		18th century	A coaching inn, later a hotel, it is in red brick on a plinth, with stone dressings, dentilled and dogtooth eaves, and a pantile roof. There are two storeys and attics, and four bays, the left bay slightly recessed. The doorway has an architrave and a rectangular fanlight, and is flanked by canted bay windows with iron balustrades. In the ground floor of the left bay is a sash window, and the other windows are casements with keystones.	II
Serlby Hall; 53.39716°N 1.04739°W		1754–55	A country house, designed by James Paine, that has been altered, and there was a major remodelling in 1812. The house is in red brick with stone dressings, quoins, a cornice, and a hipped slate roof. There are two storeys on a basement, and attics, a front of nine bays, the middle three bays projecting under a pediment, and flanking single-storey three-bay flanking wings. In the centre is a flight of steps leading to a portico with paired Tuscan columns, and an entablature with a wrought iron balustrade. The doorway has pilasters and a traceried fanlight, and is flanked by piers. The windows are sashes, the window above the doorway is in a relieving arch flanked by Ionic pilasters with fluted capitals.	I
Blyth New Bridge; 53.37813°N 1.07350°W		1770	The bridge, probably designed by John Carr, carries the A634 road over the River Ryton. It is in stone, and consists of three rusticated arches on rusticated piers on a plinth. On each pier is a coped block decorated on the west side with a roundel, and on the east side with a roundel and a swag. Between the blocks are a balustraded parapet that ends in decorative scrolls on the approach walls. These walls have wrought iron railings with rusticated round end piers.	I
Former gateway to Blyth Hall; 53.37833°N 1.06406°W		c. 1770	In the centre of the gateway are double wrought iron gates, above which is a decorative overthrow with a central bell. This is flanked by tall rusticated piers, each with a frieze decorated with paterae, and a dentilled cornice. Outside there are rusticated arches rising from imposts, each containing a wrought iron gate.	II
Archway House and Archway Cottage; 53.37621°N 1.06116°W		Late 18th century	A row of four cottages in red brick and stone with a pantile roof. There are two storeys and nine bays, the middle three bays projecting slightly under a pediment with a cornice, and containing a window. In the centre is a tall carriage arch, and in the end bays are doorways with fanlights containing Gothic tracery. The windows are casements with arched Gothic cast iron glazing bars.	II
Lower Spital Farmhouse; 53.37353°N 1.05965°W		Late 18th century	The farmhouse is in red brick, and has a pantile roof, two storeys, a double pile plan, and four bays. The doorway has a plain surround, and the windows are sashes with segmental heads.	II
Memorial to Joseph Dymond; 53.37840°N 1.06342°W		Late 18th century	The memorial is in the churchyard of St Mary and St Martin's Church. It is in stone, and consists of a square plinth surmounted by an obelisk. On the plinth is an inscription.	II
Milestone; 53.37726°N 1.06367°W		Late 18th century	The milestone is on the west side of Sheffield Road, (A634 road). It consists of a triangular stone 1 metre (3 ft 3 in) high inscribed with the distances to Barnby Moor, Maltby and Rotherham.	II
Mill Farmhouse, walls and outhouses 53.37544°N 1.05218°W	—	Late 18th century	The farmhouse is in red brick on a plinth, with a sill band, dogtooth eaves and a hipped pantile roof. There are two storeys and attics, and three bays. In the centre is a doorway with a moulded surround and a rectangular fanlight, the windows in the ground floor are sashes, and above they are casements. Flanking the house are coped brick walls linked to outhouses with pyramidal roofs.	II
Nornay South Bridge; 53.38165°N 1.06268°W	—	Late 18th century	The bridge carries Bawtry Road (B6045 road) over the River Ryton. It is in stone, and consists of two depressed arches with a band at road level. On the east side is a single cutwater, and on the west side the arch is rusticated and there are three rusticated cutwaters. The parapets end in round piers.	II
Garden seat, Serlby Park; 53.39770°N 1.05091°W	—	Late 18th century	The garden seat is in red brick, stone and stucco, and has a pantile roof with stone coped parapets. There is a single storey and three bays, the middle bay projecting and containing a Venetian window. The outer bays have sloping parapets.	II
Stable block, Serlby Park; 53.39839°N 1.04577°W	—	Late 18th century	The stable block is in red brick and stone, with dentilled eaves and hipped slate roofs. There is a single storey with lofts, and four ranges of nine bays around a quadrangle. The middle three bays of the south range project slightly under a pediment containing a clock face. The middle bay contains a flat-headed carriage entrance, and on the roof is a wooden cupola with a lead roof and a weathervane. The east range also has a pediment over the middle three bays. The openings include doorways, and various types of windows, including sashes, some of them horizontally-sliding, casements, and mullioned and transomed windows.	II
Tennis pavilion, Serlby Park; 53.39698°N 1.04869°W	—	Late 18th century	The pavilion is in red brick and stone, with hipped slate roofs. There are two storeys and three bays, a lower recessed two-storey two-bay wing on the left, and a recessed single-storey single-bay wing on the right. The middle three bays have a moulded floor band and a coped parapet, and over the central bay is a pediment. There are sash windows in all the parts.	II
The Theatre, Serlby Park; 53.39814°N 1.04615°W	—	Late 18th century	The theatre, later a house, is in red brick and stone on a plinth, with a floor band, dentilled eaves and a hipped slate roof. The main block has two storeys and attics, and three bays, the middle bay projecting slightly under an open pediment with a dentilled cornice, and the ground floor rusticated. In the upper floor of the middle bay is a Diocletian window, and the other windows are sashes. To the left is a single-storey brick extension, and at the rear is a lean-to addition.	II
The Old Vicarage; 53.37550°N 1.06040°W		Late 18th century	The house is in painted stuccoed brick, with dentilled eaves, and a pantile roof with stone coped gables and kneelers. There are two storeys and three bays, and rear extensions. The central doorway has Doric columns, a rectangular fanlight, and a moulded hood. The windows are sashes, those in the ground floor are tripartite with pilasters.	II
Ivy Cottages; 53.37808°N 1.06310°W		c. 1800	A row of four cottages in the form of a large house. They are in red brick, the right wing is stuccoed, and they have a dentilled cornice, and a hipped pantile roof. There are two storeys, the main block has five bays, and it is flanked by lower recessed two-bay wings. Over the middle three bays is a pediment, and on the roof is an arcaded octagonal cupola, with a modillion cornice, and a ribbed lead dome with a weathervane. On the front of the main block are two doorways with rectangular fanlights, and casement windows with arched Gothick cast iron glazing bars; all the openings are in recessed round-headed arches. The wings have similar windows, in the left wing is a doorway with a segmental head, and the right wing has a lean-to porch.	II
Nornay House; 53.38313°N 1.06286°W	—	c. 1800	The house is in red brick, and has a pantile roof with coped gables and kneelers. There are two storeys and attics, and three bays. The central doorway has fluted pilasters, a rectangular fanlight, and a slightly projecting hood, and the windows are casements.	II
3, 4 and 5 Angel Cottage; 53.37791°N 1.06186°W		Early 19th century	A row of three cottages in painted brick, with a floor band, dogtooth eaves and a pantile roof. There are two storeys and six bays. On the front are three doorways, and windows, most of which are horizontally-sliding sashes, all with segmental heads.	II
12–16 High Street; 53.37601°N 1.06098°W		Early 19th century	A row of three cottages in red brick, with a pantile roof and a coped gable with kneelers on the right. There are two storeys and nine bays. Each cottage has a central doorway, and the windows are casements with arched Gothic cast iron glazing bars.	II
Ice house, Centry Garth; 53.37875°N 1.06204°W	—	Early 19th century	The ice house is in red brick and has a central doorway flanked by shaped walls. A short passage with two niches leads to a round domed chamber.	II
Pigeoncote and outbuildings, Nornay House; 53.38327°N 1.06309°W	—	Early 19th century	The buildings are in red brick with pantile roofs. The pigeoncote has a dogtooth eaves band and a pyramidal roof. There are three storeys and two bays, and two tiers of perch bands. The doorway and an opening to the right have segmental heads. Attached to it are steps leading to a barn that has two storeys and four bays, and attached to this is a single-storey three-bay extension.	II
Parish room 53.37513°N 1.06119°W	—	Early 19th century	Originally a toll house, the parish room is in stuccoed brick, and has a hipped slate roof with overhanging eaves on wrought iron brackets. There is a single storey and three bays. The central doorway has a rectangular fanlight, the windows are casements, and all the openings have Tudor-style hood moulds. At the rear is a single-storey single-bay extension.	II
Rose Cottage; 53.37419°N 1.06045°W		Early 19th century	A house in cottage orné style, it is stuccoed on a blue brick base, and has a hipped slate and pantile roof. There are two storeys and three bays, and the right corner is canted. In the centre is a projecting canted porch, the doorway with a pointed arch, and on the sides are fixed windows with Gothick tracery. The other windows are casements with pointed heads and Gothick tracery.	II
Boat house, Serlby Park; 53.39844°N 1.05098°W	—	Early 19th century	The boat house is in rendered brick on a stone base, and has a hipped slate roof projecting over the eaves. There is a single storey, with two storeys at the lake side. The entrance is canted with a central doorway that has a fanlight with a pointed arch, flanked by fixed lights with pointed arches. At the lake side is an opening with a flat head, over which is a doorway that has a fanlight with a pointed arch.	II
East Lodge, Serlby Park; 53.39554°N 1.03527°W		Early 19th century	The lodge to Serlby Hall is in stone, and has a hipped slate roof with overhanging eaves. There is a single storey, a canted front of three bays, and a rear extension. The central doorway is flanked by casement windows.	II
Ice house, Serlby Hall; 53.39749°N 1.04884°W	—	Early 19th century	The ice house is in red brick and stone, and has an eaves bar, and a stone coped gable with kneelers. In the centre is an arched doorway leading to a short passage, a flight of brick steps, and a large circular domed chamber.	II
Reeves Cottage, Serlby Park; 53.39946°N 1.04593°W	—	Early 19th century	Two cottages, later combined into one, it is in red brick with dogtooth eaves and a hipped pantile roof. There are two storeys and five bays, and a recessed single-storey single-bay extension on the right. In the centre is a blocked doorway with a segmental head, and elsewhere are other doorways, and horizontally-sliding sash windows.	II
South Lodge, Serlby Park; 53.37733°N 1.04420°W		Early 19th century	The lodge to Serlby Hall is in stone, and has a hipped slate roof with overhanging eaves. There is a single storey, and four bays, the canted ends forming a semi-octagonal plan. On the front is a canted bay window and a doorway, and the windows are casements.	II
Spital House; 53.36958°N 1.05709°W	—	Early 19th century	A house in stuccoed stone on a plinth, with floor bands, a modillion cornice, and a hipped slate roof. There are two storeys and a west front of three bays. In the centre is a porch with Doric columns carrying a modillion decorated hood, the doorway has pilasters and a traceried fanlight, and the windows are sashes. The east front has five bays, two bay windows and a balustrade.	II
Wall, gate piers and gates, Spital House; 53.36982°N 1.05687°W	—	Early 19th century	The wall enclosing the grounds is in coped stone with wrought iron railings. To the east and west are pairs of stone gate piers, each with blind panelling and shaped coping.	II
Bridge south of Reeves Cottage, Serlby Park; 53.39900°N 1.04558°W	—	c. 1832	The bridge carries a road over the River Ryton. It is in stone, and consists of a single arch with a keystone and a band. The parapets have moulded copings and round end piers.	II
Bridge to Serlby Hall; 53.39788°N 1.04099°W	—	c. 1832	The bridge carries a road over the River Ryton. It is in brick and stone, and consists of a single brick arch. The stone parapets have moulded copings on plinths, and round end piers.	II
Gate piers and gates, St Mary and St Martin's Church; 53.37823°N 1.06274°W		Mid 19th century	At the entrance to the churchyard are three square stone coped gate piers with shaped panels. Between the piers are double gates and a single gate in wrought iron.	II
Blyth and Hodsock War Memorial; 53.37272°N 1.05922°W		1922	The war memorial is in a cemetery, and is in Cornish granite. It consists of a tapering octagonal shaft carrying a Latin cross under a gable, under which is a shield painted with the Cross of St. George. The shaft is on a tapering octagonal plinth with an inscription and the names of those lost in the two World Wars. The plinth is on a two-stage octagonal base with an inscription.	II
Telephone kiosk 53.37730°N 1.06172°W		1935	The K6 type telephone kiosk in Retford Road was designed by Giles Gilbert Scott. Constructed in cast iron with a square plan and a dome, it has three unperforated crowns in the top panels.	II
