= Nottinghamshire Wildlife Trust =

Wildlife conservation charity

- Type: Conservation charity
- Headquarters: The Old Ragged School, Nottingham
- Revenue: 3,734,578 pound sterling (2020)
- Number of employees: 86 (2024)

The Nottinghamshire Wildlife Trust founded in 1963 is a wildlife conservation charity working to protect and enhance the wildlife and habitats of Nottinghamshire. They care for over 60 nature reserves covering more than 2,000 acres (8.1 km^{2}) of wildlife habitat ranging from wildflower meadows to wetlands to ancient woodland. Key reserves are Attenborough Nature Reserve and Idle Valley Nature Reserve.

They engage the local community through events, information, volunteering and education opportunities and seek to ensure the county is a healthy and wildlife rich place to live. They are one of the 46 members of The Wildlife Trusts and have 11,000 members.

Nottinghamshire Wildlife Trust also advise other landowners how to manage their land to benefit wildlife.

Nottinghamshire Wildlife Trust is a company limited by guarantee, registered in England no. 748865; and a registered charity.

== History ==
The Nottinghamshire Wildlife Trust was formed in May 1963 as the Nottinghamshire Trust for Nature Conservation. Attenborough Nature Reserve was the first site to be under the control of the Trust in 1966, when the land was leased from CEMEX. The first reserve the trust purchased outright was Treswell Wood in 1973. In 1989, the Trust purchased a small section of what is now the Idle Valley Nature Reserve, which the Trust has since bought the rest of the site. As of February 2020 the Trust were working to purchase Attenborough Nature Reserve from CEMEX, having raised funds in excess of their £1 million target.
