= Barrow Hills Sandpit =

Protected area in Nottinghamshire, England

Coordinates: 53.417691°N 0.97380850°W

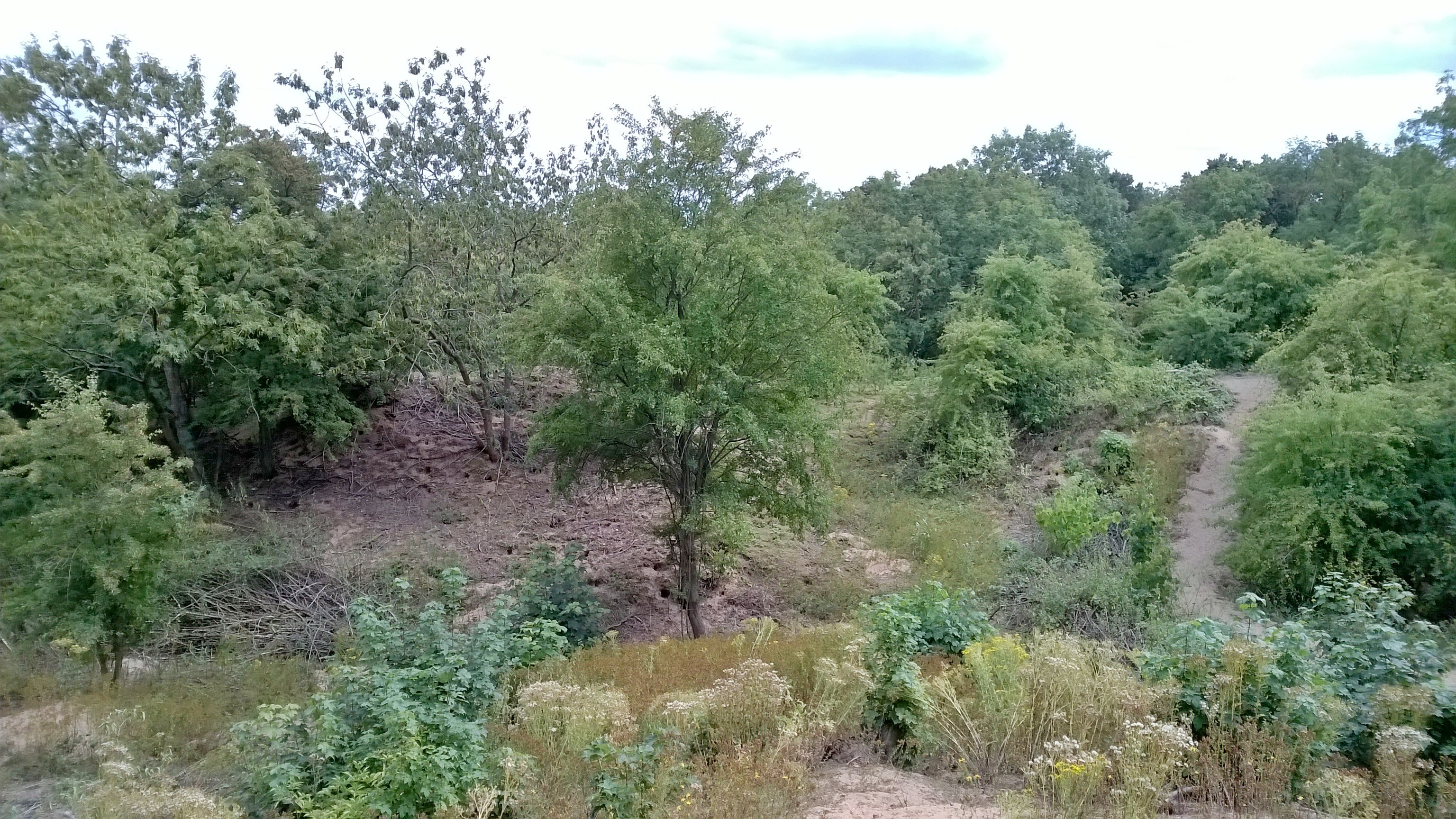
Barrow Hills Sandpit

Barrow Hills Sandpit is a Site of Special Scientific Interest (SSSI) in Nottinghamshire, England. It is located next to the hamlet of Harwell, 3 km east of the town of Bawtry. This area is protected because of its species-rich grassland. Historically, this area has been quarried for sand.

Barrow Hills Sandpit SSSI has been visited by Doncaster Naturalists' Society.

== Biology ==
There are areas of heathland habitat where plant species include gorse, broom and heath bedstraw. Where pebbles and limestone nodules have been exposed, plant species include common stork's-bill, buck's-horn plantain, hoary cinquefoil, biting stonecrop, lesser hawkbit , restharrow and viper's-bugloss. Buckthorn is also present in this protected area.

== Land ownership ==
All land in this protected area is owned by the local authority.
