= St Mary and St Martin's Church, Blyth =

St Mary and St. Martin's Church, Blyth
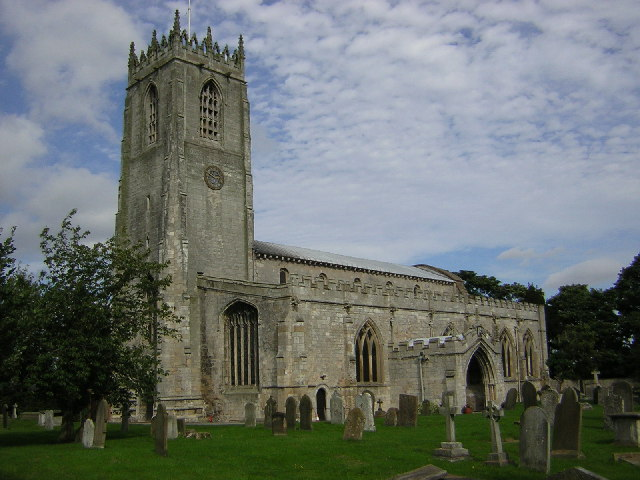
- St Mary and St. Martin's Church, Blyth
- 53°22′50.38″N 01°3′42.82″W
- Country: England
- Denomination: Church of England
- Churchmanship: Broad Church

History
- Dedication: St Mary & St Martin

Architecture
- Heritage designation: Grade I listed

Administration
- Province: York
- Diocese: Diocese of Southwell and Nottingham
- Deanery: Bassetlaw & Bawtry
- Parish: Blyth, Nottinghamshire

St. Mary and St. Martin's Church, Blyth, is a Grade I listed parish church in Blyth, Nottinghamshire, England.

== Priory ==
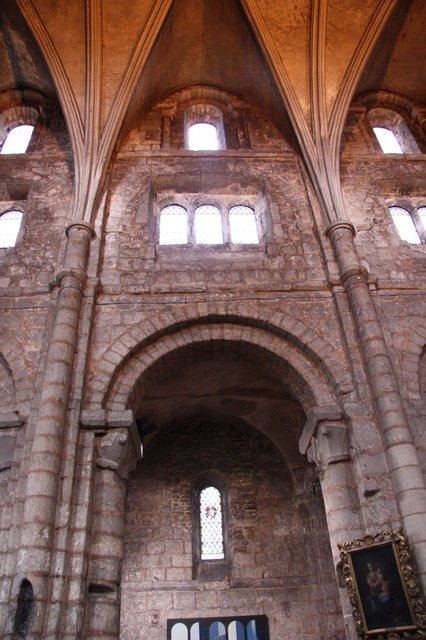
Double height clerestory

The priory of St. Mary and St. Martin is one of the oldest examples of Norman architecture in the country. It was part of a Benedictine monastery founded in 1088. This priory was founded by Roger de Builli of Tickhill Castle, one of William the Conqueror's followers.

The founder and later benefactors endowed Blyth with lands, money and churches. It was staffed at first by monks from the Mother House, Holy Trinity Priory at Rouen France. In 1286 Thomas Russel had to be returned to Rouen because of his intolerable conduct and also John de Belleville, as the climate did not suit him. There are other records of the unruly conduct of French monks.

During a visitation of the priory in 1536 it was alleged that five of the monks were guilty of grave offences and it was surrendered. George Dalton, the Prior, received a pension of twenty marks, and this seems to have been the only pension awarded. The net annual income at the date of the surrender was £180. (equivalent to £130,000 as of 2025),

== Parish Church ==
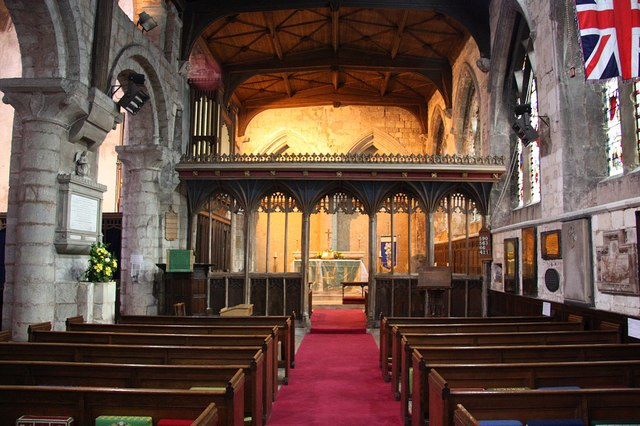
The nave and chancel

After the Dissolution the east part of the church was demolished and a tower built at the west end of the nave.

There was a restoration in 1885 by C. Hodgson Fowler, the contractor being Thomas Woolston of Stamford.

== Organ ==
A specification of the organ can be found on the National Pipe Organ Register.

== Viral video ==
The church gained notoriety after a video of a flash mob wedding held in the church was posted on YouTube on 21 June 2013.

== See also ==
- Grade I listed buildings in Nottinghamshire
- Listed buildings in Blyth, Nottinghamshire
