= Attenborough Nature Reserve =

Nature reserve in Nottinghamshire, England

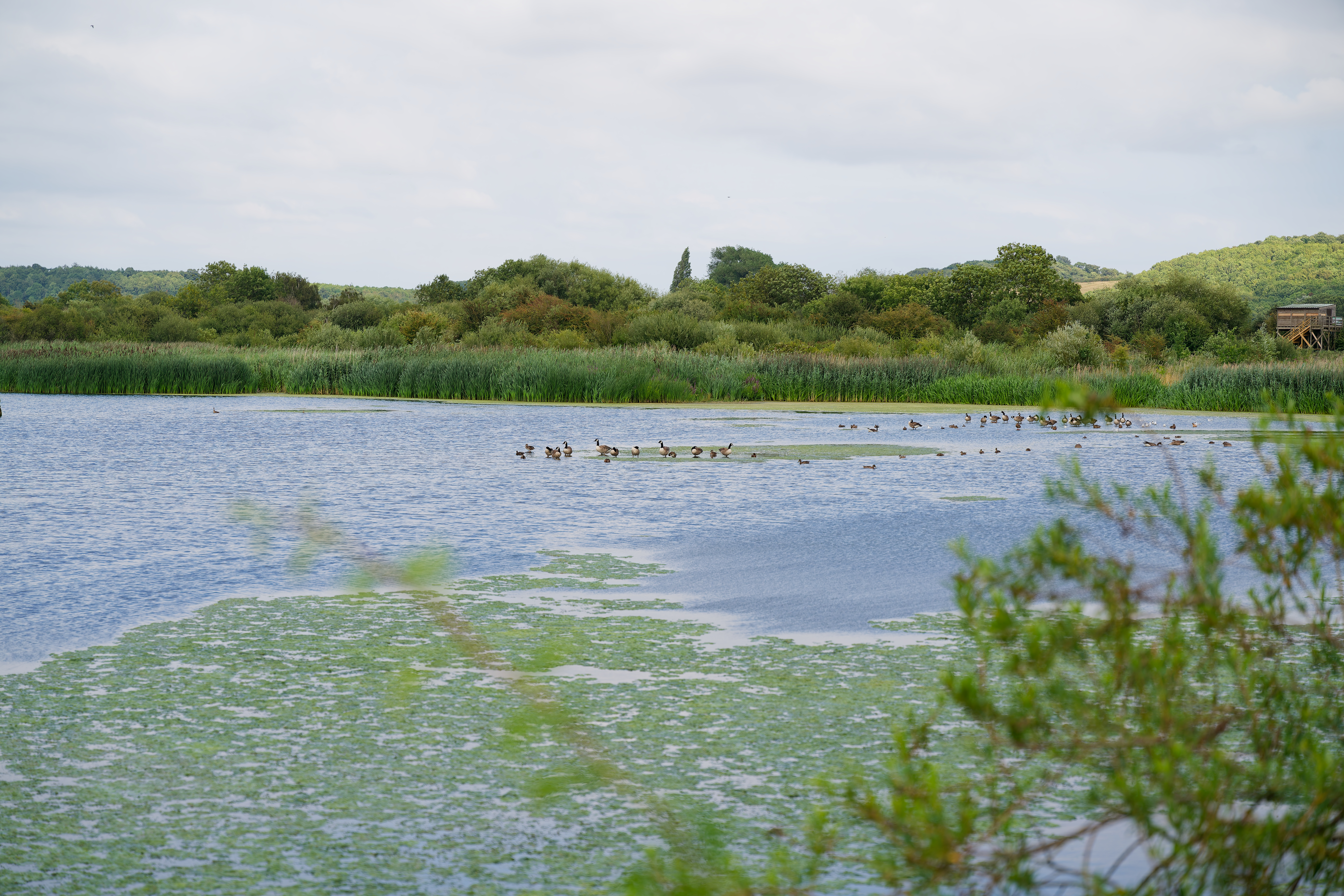
- The nature reserve looking towards the lake.

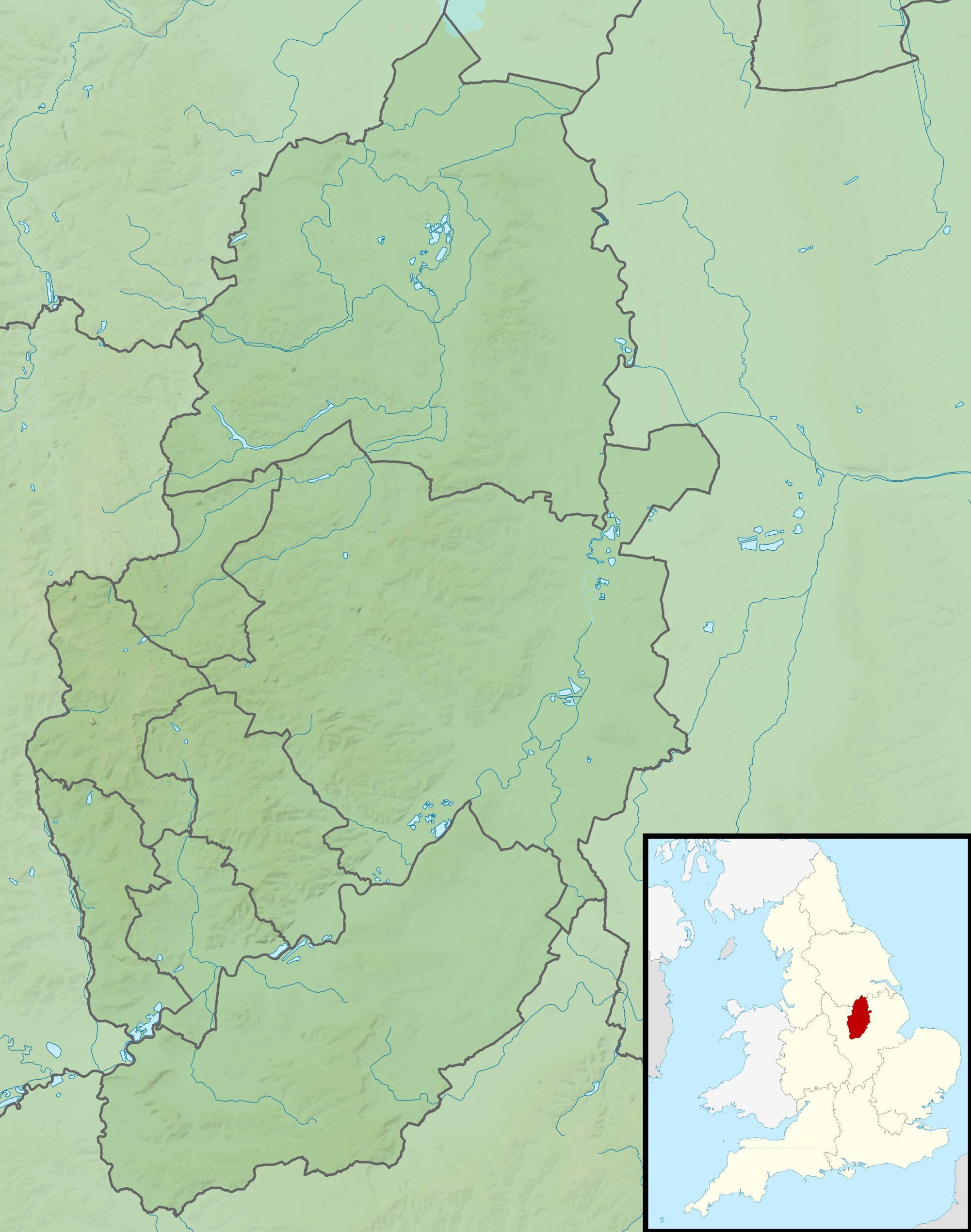
- Location within Nottinghamshire
- Interactive map of Attenborough Nature Reserve
- Location: Attenborough, Nottinghamshire, England
- Nearest city: Nottingham
- Coordinates: 52°53′59″N 1°14′09″W
- Area: 220 hectares (540 acres)
- Created: 1966
- Owner: Nottinghamshire Wildlife Trust
- Open: All year
- Status: SSSI (for map see Map)
- Website: nottinghamshirewildlife.org/attenborough

Attenborough Nature Reserve is a nature reserve at Attenborough, Nottinghamshire, England, located 5 mi (8 km) south west of Nottingham city centre. It is owned and managed by Nottinghamshire Wildlife Trust, supported by Broxtowe Borough Council, following the completion of purchase from Cemex UK in December 2020.

At its centre is a building called Attenborough Nature Centre, comprising visitor services and educational facilities.

== History ==
The site was used as gravel pits between 1929 and 1967, and was latterly still owned by CEMEX, the gravel extraction company, who continue to extract sand and gravel from neighbouring areas. As sections of the site are worked out they are restored as wetland. In 2010 an area known as Thrumpton's Land was restored in this way. The reserve was established at the completion of an earlier phase of workings in 1966 and was opened by the naturalist and broadcaster Sir David Attenborough.

In late 2019, the owners announced their desire to sell the site, and an appeal backed by Sir David Attenborough, whose family traditionally hail from the area, was launched to raise £1,000,000 needed to enable transfer of ownership to Nottinghamshire Wildlife Trust, which had helped to maintain the site with the owners for 60 years.

The purchase of the site from Cemex UK was concluded in December 2020, following a £750,000 grant allocated as part of the Landfill Communities Fund from Biffa Award.

== Geography ==
The reserve now covers 145 hectares of lakes, wetland, grassland and scrub. It sits at the confluence of the River Erewash and the Trent, and is part of an area designated as the Attenborough Gravel Pits Site of Special Scientific Interest (SSSI). The SSSI covers 226.6 hectares (560 acres) and extends westwards beyond the reserve, to the County Boundary.

There are large lakes formed by the flooded pits, known as Church Pond, Clifton Pond, Main Pond, Tween Pond and Beeston Pond, plus drier areas of scrub and grassland such as Corbetts Meadow and Erewash field. There are also areas of native willow and woodland.

The gravel pits are significant for the numbers of wintering shoveler and bitterns, as well as the numbers of breeding birds. The species count since 1966 is now over 250 bird species. Among the nationally rare birds seen at the reserve are penduline tit (1994), squacco heron (1998 and 2011), purple heron (2003 and 2016) and sora (2004).

== Facilities ==
The Attenborough Nature Centre at the site provides an educational facility, shop and refreshment point and car park for the reserve, accessed from Barton Lane, Attenborough. The centre was completed in 2005, since which it has won a Gold award for eco-tourism. Almost 40 years after he opened the reserve itself, Sir David Attenborough returned to open the centre. An article in BBC Wildlife listed it as number 9 in a top ten 'eco places in the world'. The facilities are open seven days a week, and the centre is surrounded by the ponds. There are also two public bird hides.

== Gallery ==
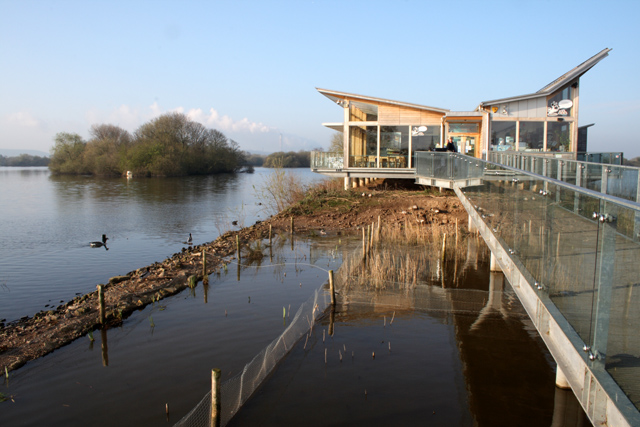
The Nature Centre with raised walkway

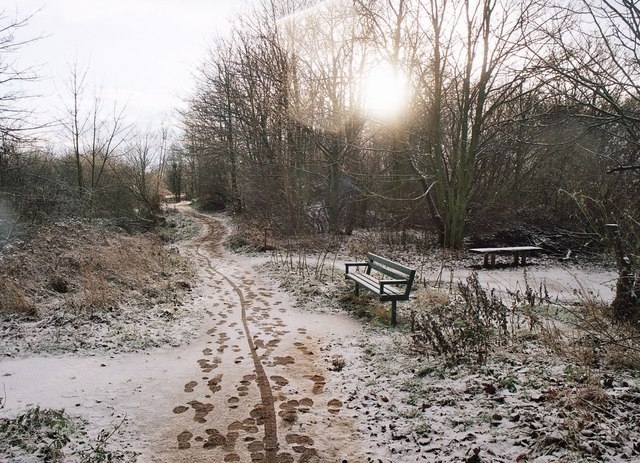
A winter nature trail

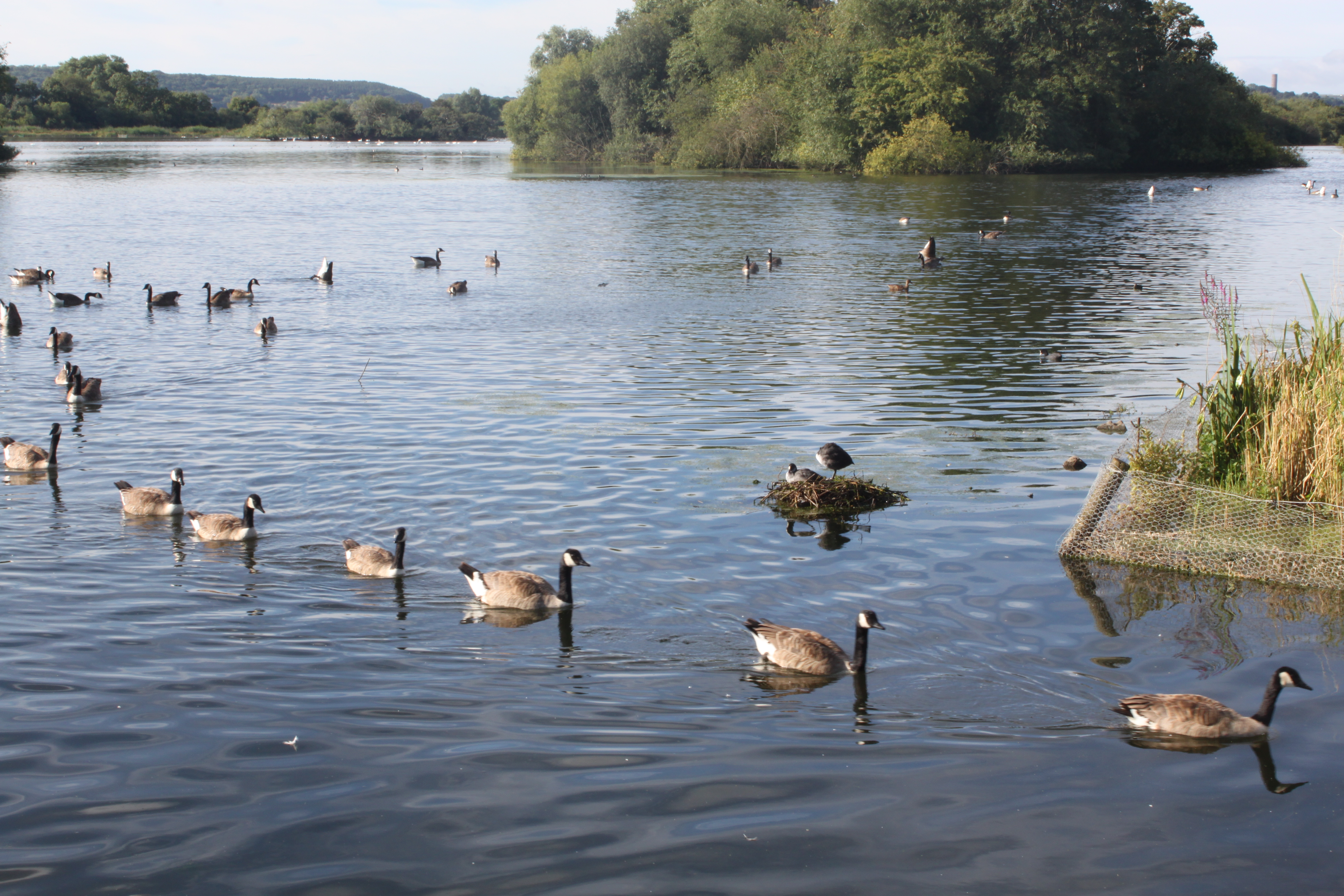
Canada geese swimming in line

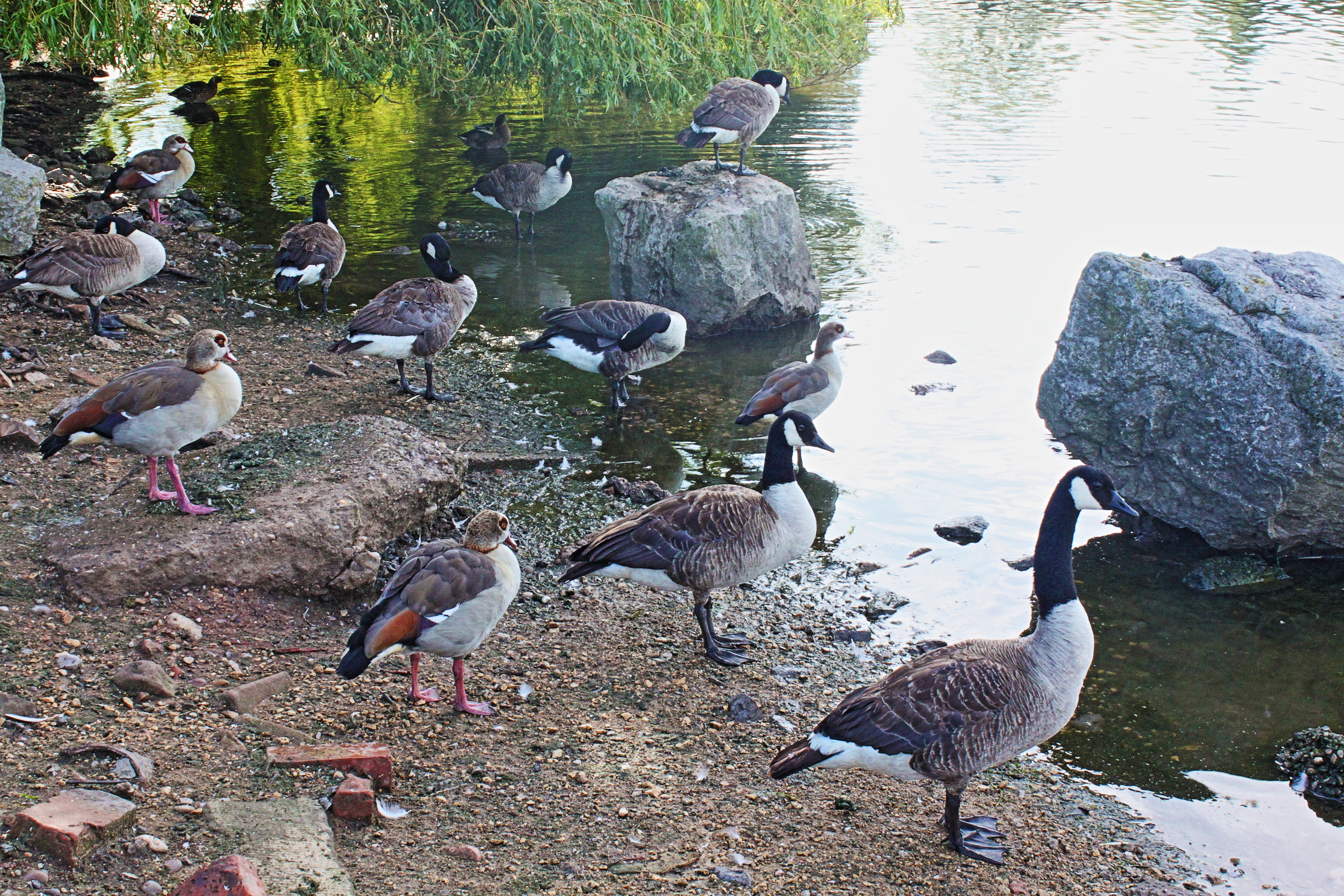
Egyptian and Canada geese together

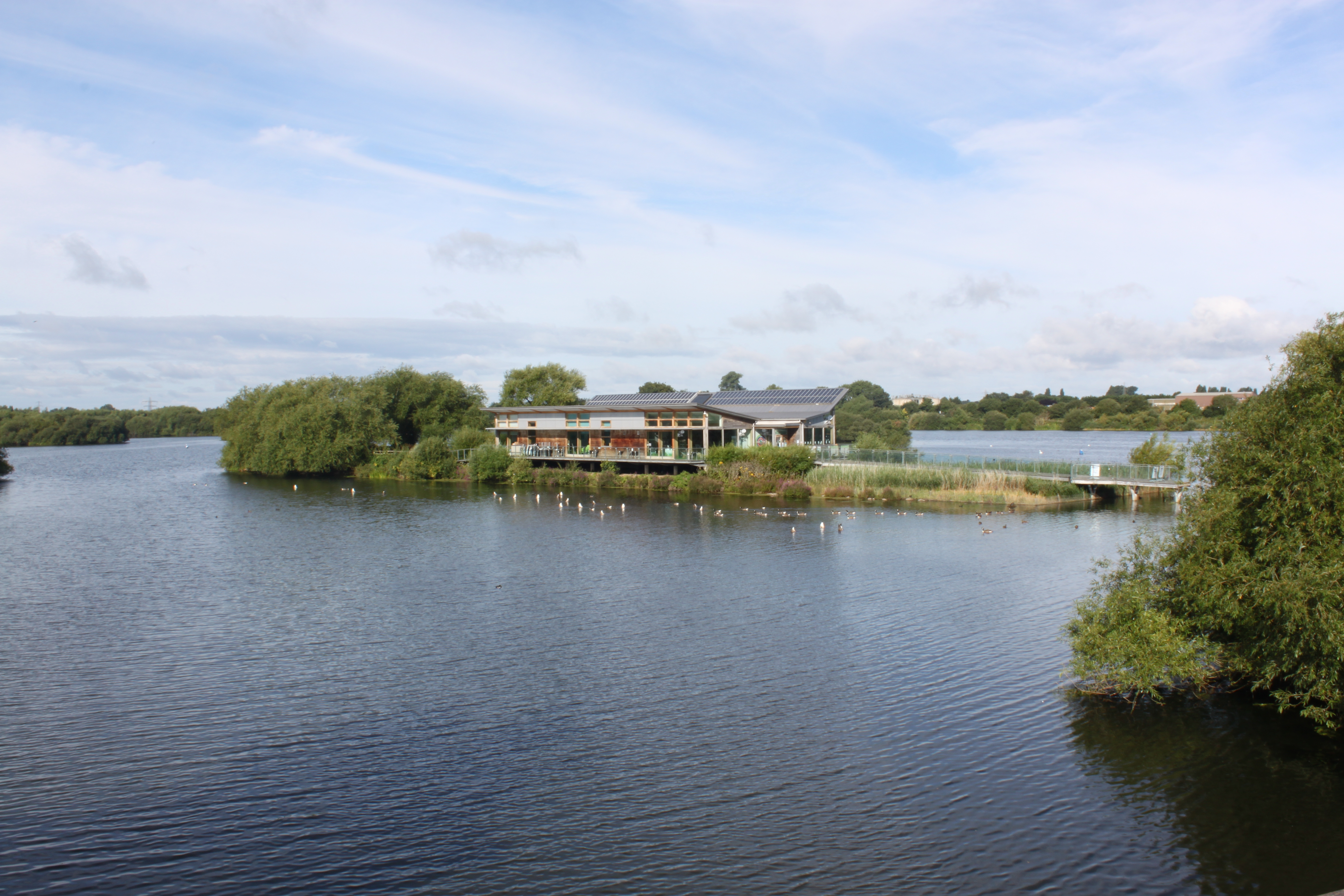
Nature Centre viewed from the main footbridge

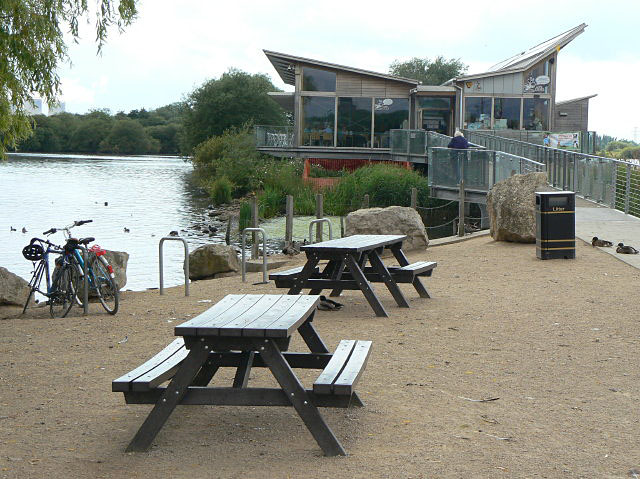
Lakeside picnic area

== See also ==
- List of Sites of Special Scientific Interest in Nottinghamshire
