= Blyth, Nottinghamshire =

Coordinates: 53.3771°N 1.0618°W

Blyth
- Village and civil parish
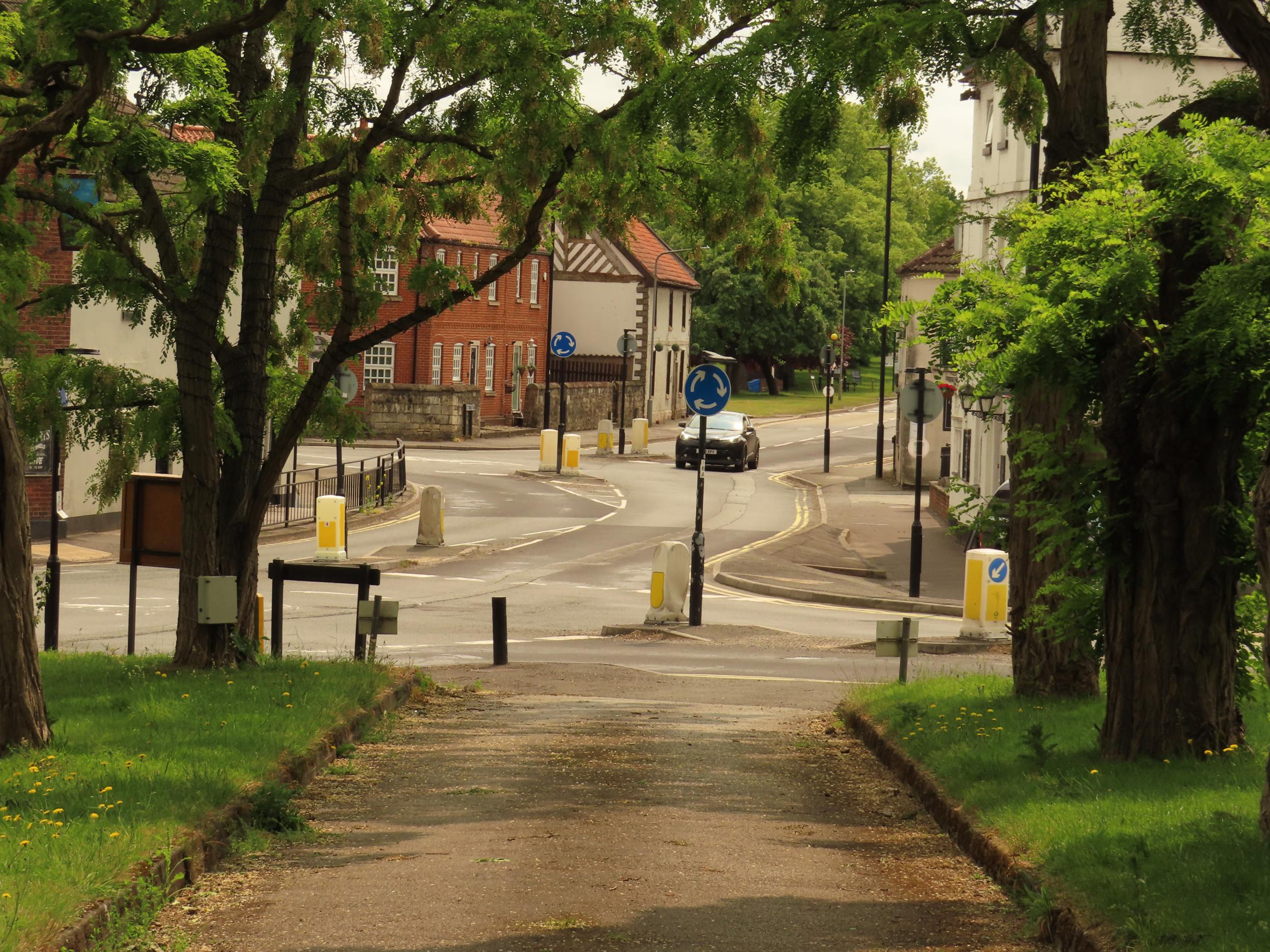
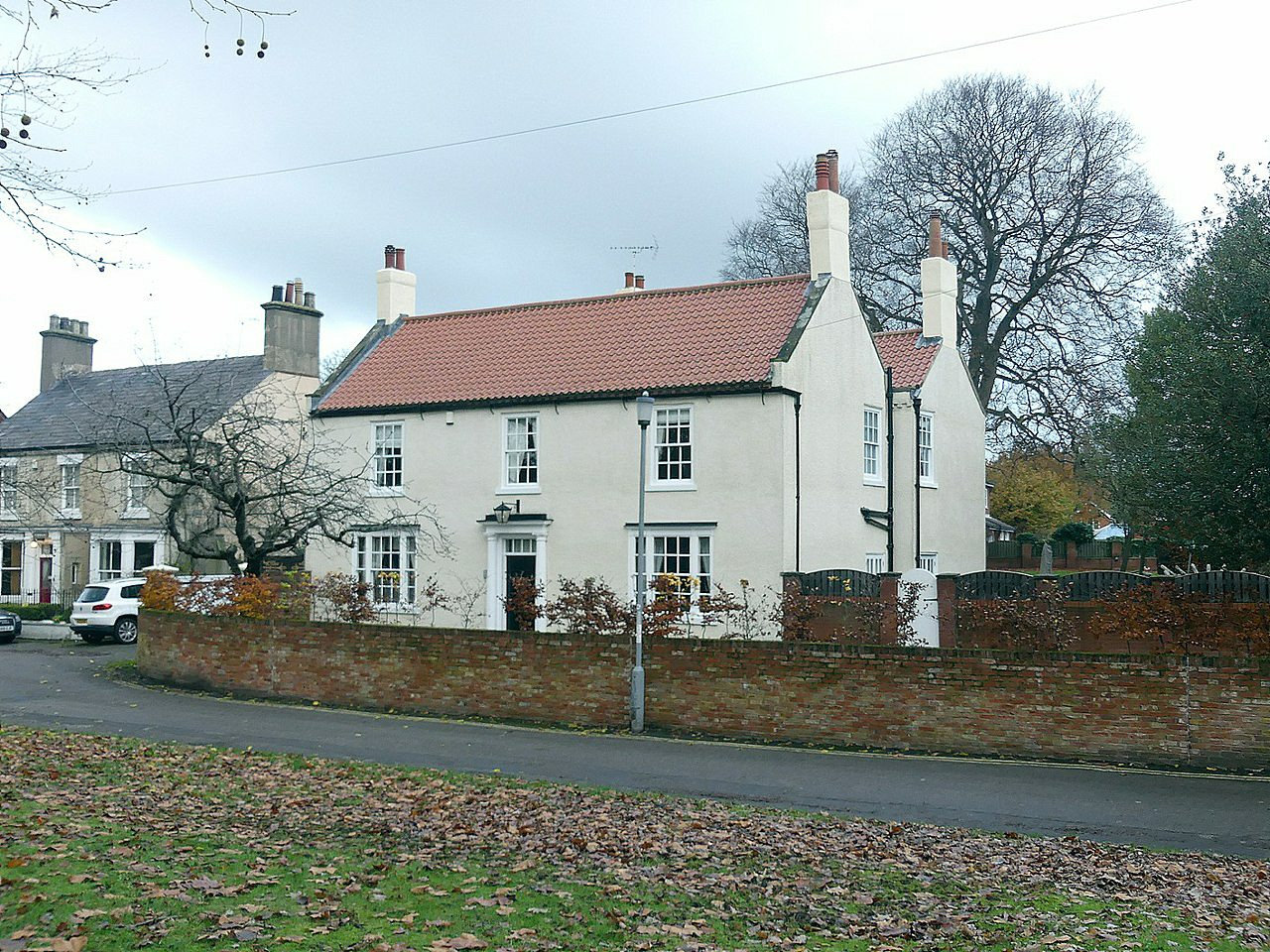
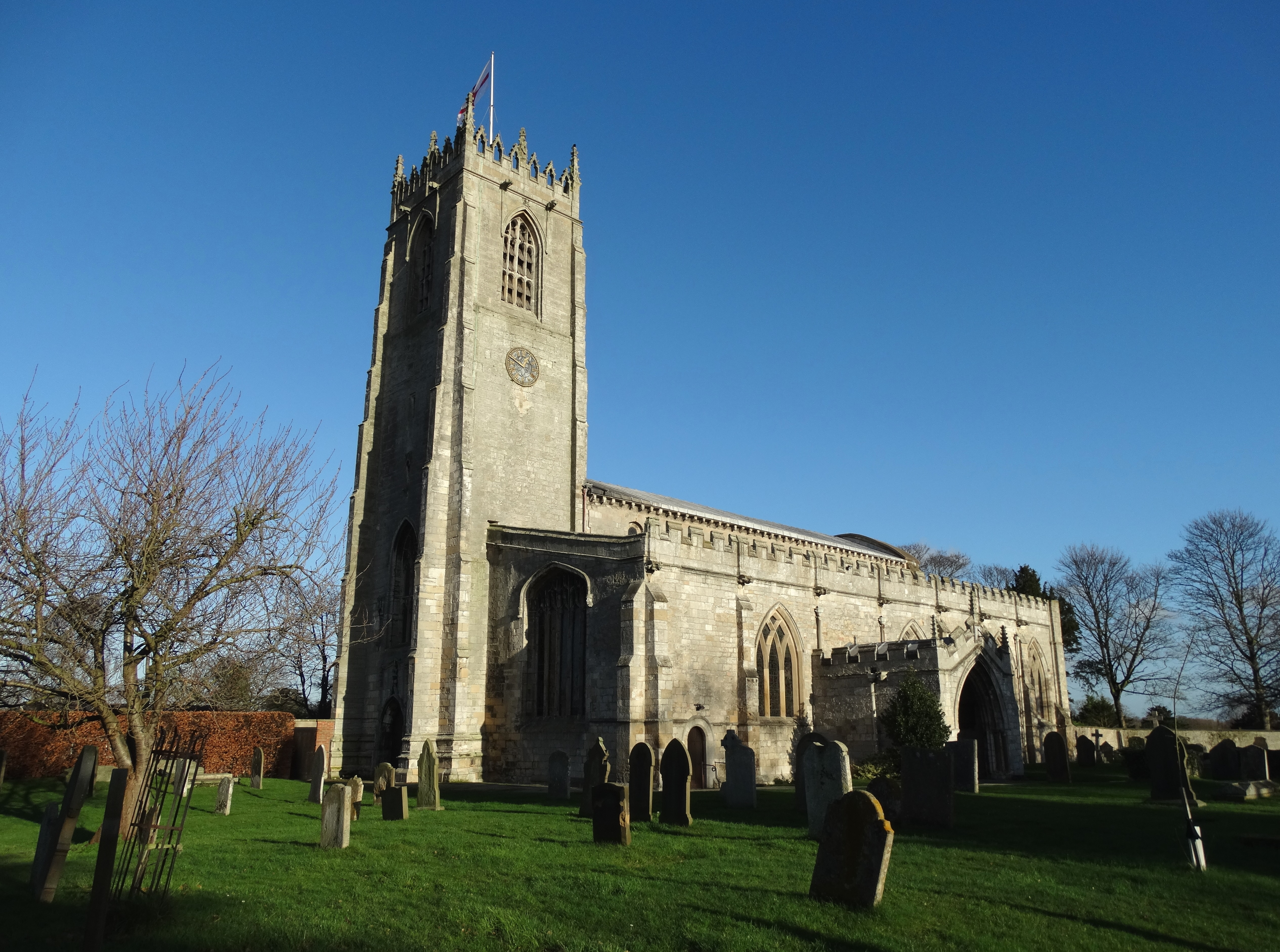
- High Street Old Vicarage St Mary’s Church

- Location within Nottinghamshire
- Interactive map of Blyth
- Area: 3.18 sq mi (8.2 km^{2})
- Population: 1,265 (2021)
  - Density: 398/sq mi (154/km^{2})
- OS grid reference: SK 625869
  - London: 135 mi (217 km) SE
- District: Bassetlaw
- Shire county: Nottinghamshire
- Region: East Midlands
- Country: England
- Sovereign state: United Kingdom
- Post town: WORKSOP
- Postcode district: S81
- Dialling code: 01909
- Police: Nottinghamshire
- Fire: Nottinghamshire
- Ambulance: East Midlands
- UK Parliament: Bassetlaw
- Website: www.blythparish.co.uk

Blyth is a village and civil parish in the Bassetlaw district of the county of Nottinghamshire, in the East Midlands, north west of East Retford, on the River Ryton. The population of the civil parish as of the 2011 census was 1,233, and this increased to 1,265 in 2021. It sits at a junction with the A1, and the end of the motorway section from Doncaster.

== Geography ==
The village is situated on the A1 at the southern end of the fifteen-mile A1(M) Doncaster bypass, which opened at the end of July 1961. The Blyth roundabout was replaced in March 2008 by a grade separated junction (junction 34).

The £338,000 (equivalent to £6,410,000 in 2025), 1½ mile A614 Blyth Bypass was built at the same time as the Nottinghamshire section of the Doncaster Bypass

The southbound carriageway opened on Wednesday 26 October 1960, as a section of the A614, and both carriageways opened around four weeks later, built by Sir Robert McAlpine.

Nottinghamshire County Council had accepted a contract of £735,325 on 5 May 1959 for the Nottinghamshire section of the new motorway. Work began in May 1959, to be finished by April 1961.

The A614 became the A1 when the Doncaster bypass opened. Also passing through the village is the A634 from Maltby to Barnby Moor.

The dual-carriageway £964,000 (equivalent to £15,680,000 in 2025), five-mile section of the A1, the Chequer House (Ranby) to Blyth Improvement, opened in May 1966. This had previously been a dangerous three-lane road.

The former A614 road through the town is now the A634 and B6045.

=== Services ===
In 1959, the roadside cafe was called the 'Hill Top Cafe'.

The Little Chef opened at the end of August 1973.

The Blue Star service area closed on Wednesday 18 December 1985, when owned by Jim Gregory (football chairman). The site had opened in 1956, and was much improved in 1964. The site was sold to be redeveloped, but this did not happen for over a year.

The Moto Blyth Services are also at this junction. Esso bought the Blyth site in December 1986. Granada Motorway Services put a £3.25m planning proposal which was passed on Wednesday 4 March 1987. It would be Granada's 17th service station. The 188 seat restaurant opened in February 1988.

== History ==
=== Blyth Priory ===
The priory church of St. Mary and St. Martin is one of the oldest examples of Norman architecture in the country. It was part of a Benedictine monastery founded in 1088. This priory was founded by Roger de Builli of Tickhill Castle, one of William the Conqueror's followers.

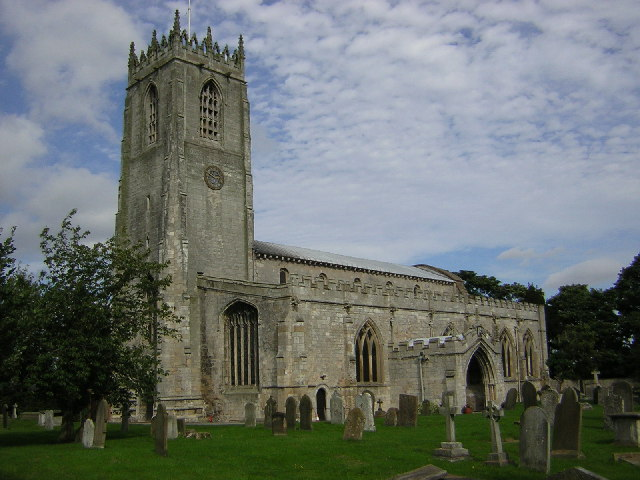
St Mary and St Martin's Church, Blyth.

The founder and later benefactors endowed Blyth with lands, money and churches. It was staffed at first by monks from the Mother House, Holy Trinity Priory at Rouen France. In 1286 Thomas Russel had to be returned to Rouen because of his intolerable conduct and also John de Belleville, as the climate did not suit him. There are other records of the unruly conduct of French monks.

During a visitation of the priory in 1536 it was alleged that five of the monks were guilty of grave offences and it was surrendered. George Dalton, the Prior, received a pension of twenty marks, and this seems to have been the only pension awarded. The net annual income at the date of the surrender was £180. (equivalent to £130,000 in 2025).

After the Dissolution the east part of the church was demolished and a tower built at the west end of the nave.

See St Mary and St Martin's Church, Blyth for more information.

=== Blyth Hall ===
In 1603 Sir Edward Stanhope sold the Blyth estate to Robert Saunderson, of Gilthwaite, Rotherham.

In 1635 the 490-acre estate was sold by the Saunderson family to John Mellish, a London merchant. His son Edward, a merchant in Portugal, returned to England in 1671 and in 1684 commissioned the demolition of the old priory and the building of Blyth Hall immediately north of the church. The hall stood at approximately 53°22'45.39"N 1° 3'48.46"W. He was High Sheriff of Nottinghamshire for 1692–93 and died unmarried in 1703, leaving the property to Joseph Mellish, his cousin's son. It descended in the Mellish family until 1806, when it was sold to Joshua Walker, the son of an ironmaster from Rotherham.

Joshua's son and heir, Henry Frederick Walker (born 1807), was High Sheriff of Nottinghamshire for 1852–53. At the end of the 19th century the hall was bought by Francis Willey, 1st Baron Barnby, a Bradford wool merchant. He was High Sheriff for 1908–09 and was succeeded by his son Vernon Willey, 2nd Baron Barnby, who was the MP for South Bradford.

The hall was demolished in 1972 and the site is now occupied by a housing estate.

On the village green is the former Leper Hospital of St John the Evangelist, said to have been built by the Knights Hospitaller of St. John of Jerusalem. It was refounded in 1226, and was being used as a school in 1695.

Blyth is situated near to Hodsock Priory (which has never been a priory).

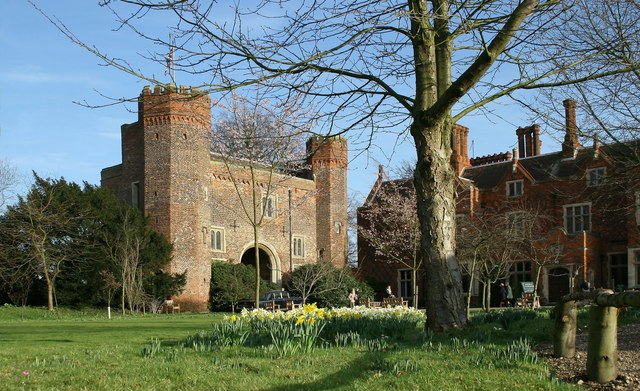
Hodsock Priory

== See also ==
- Listed buildings in Blyth, Nottinghamshire
