= Idle Valley Nature Reserve =

Wetland in Nottinghamshire, England

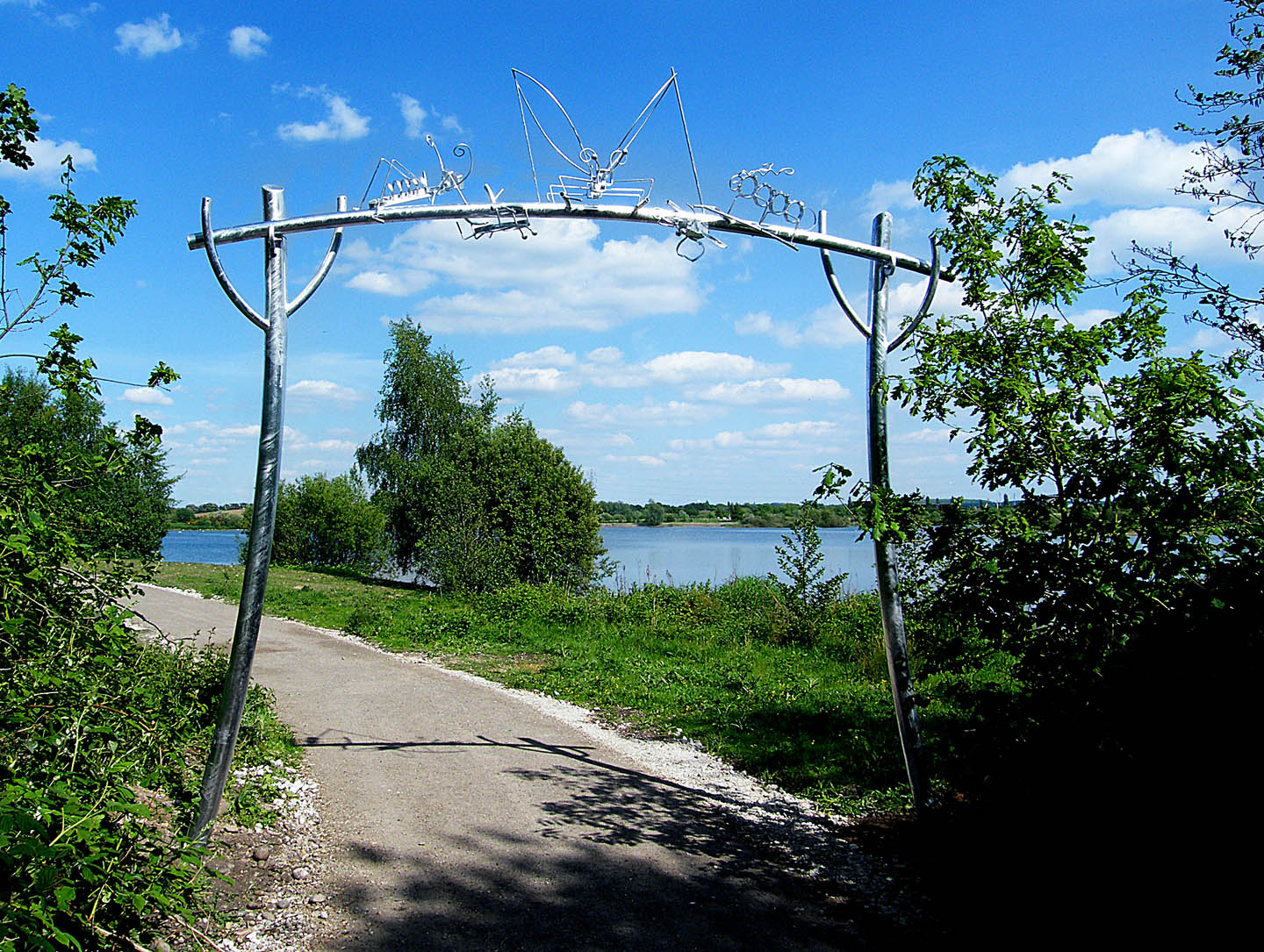
- Bug Arch at the entrance of the nature reserve, with Bellmoor Lake in the distance.

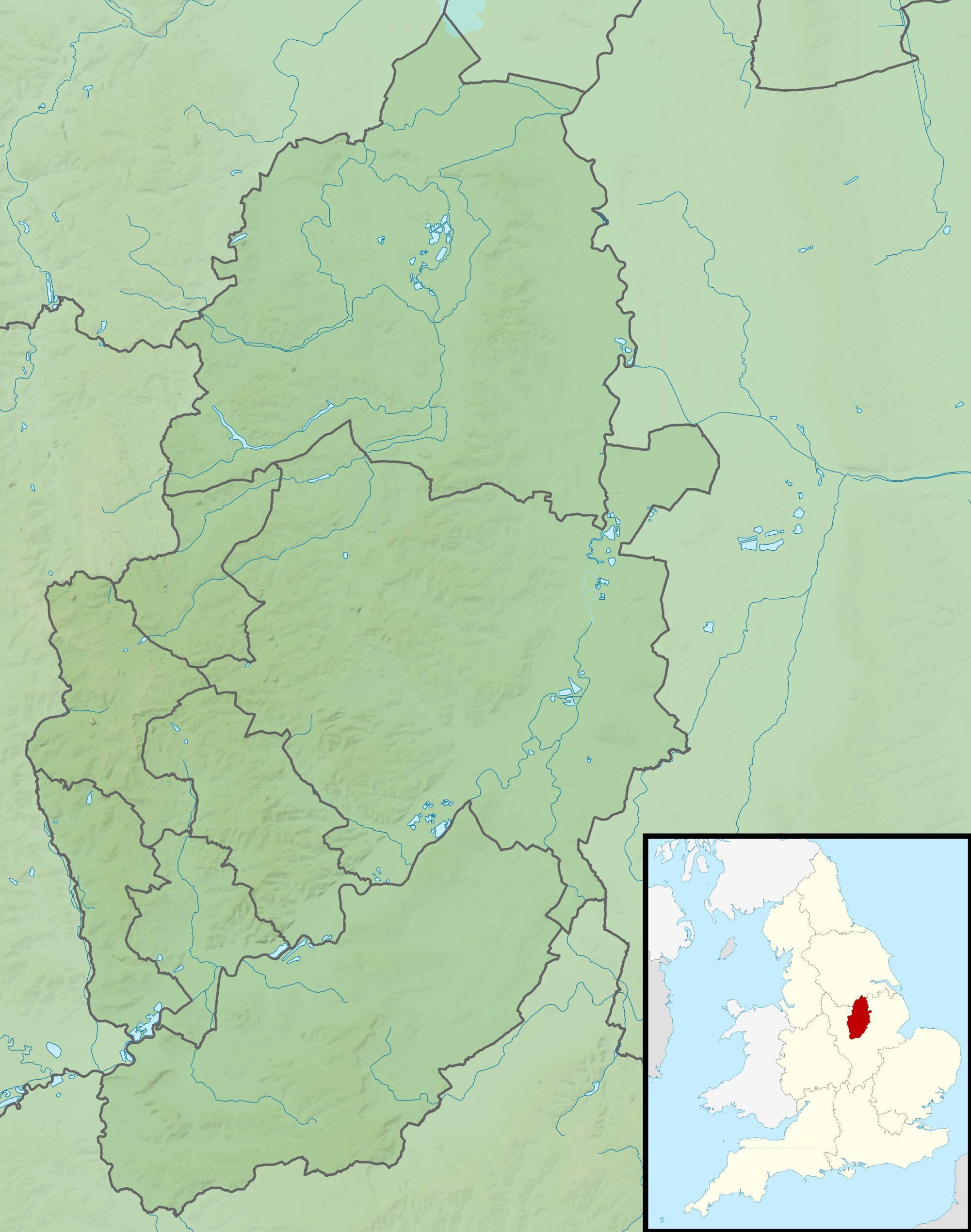
- Location within Nottinghamshire
- Location: Retford, Nottinghamshire, England
- Coordinates: 53°20′21″N 0°57′56″W
- Area: 320 hectares (790 acres)
- Created: 2002
- Operator: Nottinghamshire Wildlife Trust
- Status: SSSI (for map see Map)

The Idle Valley Nature Reserve, also known as Lound Gravel Pits or Sutton and Lound Gravel Pits, is a wetland Site of Special Scientific Interest (SSSI) situated north-west of the town of Retford in the Bassetlaw district of north Nottinghamshire. The nature reserve is situated along the western bank of the River Idle and east of the villages of Sutton cum Lound and Lound. The nature reserve is managed by the Nottinghamshire Wildlife Trust.

== History ==
The area that now forms the nature reserve was quarried for sand and gravel from the mid-1940s onwards. Tarmac Limited acquired the quarries in 1981. Bellmore Quarry was at the southern end of the site, and around 350,000 tonnes of sand and gravel were extracted every year until extraction ceased in 2005. Lound Quarry was to the north of Bellmore, and produced around 500,000 tonnes of aggregate every year, until its closure in 2011. It has been estimated that the quarries supplied some 30 million tonnes of sand and gravel to the local construction industry, during the lifetime of the quarrying operation. The mineral extraction consent under which the quarry operated required that the land should be restored for agricultural use once it ceased to be a quarry. This required huge volumes of fill, as between 2 and 3 metres (6.6 and 9.8 ft) of material had been removed over the entire site. Initially, pulverised fuel ash (PFA) from Cottam power station was turned into a slurry and pumped to the site by Powergen, but Powergen ceased to supply the PFA in the early 1990s, and the large voids that were still left filled with water. They gradually regenerated naturally, providing habitat for breeding, wintering and passage birds.

In 2002, Natural England designated the site, formally known as the Sutton And Lound Gravel Pits, as an SSSI. Tarmac subsequently agreed to donate all of its land within the SSSI to the Nottinghamshire Wildlife Trust, to ensure its long-term care and management. The Idle Valley Learning Centre which offers diploma courses in environmental conservation from North Nottinghamshire College was opened in 2008 and is owned by the college. The nature reserve received £1 million in Lottery funding in 2008. Paths, fencing and clearing of land has also taken place since the handover of the land, the efforts of which in 2011 won Tarmac the Mineral Products Association Cooper-Heyman Cup double award. In 2017, a new boardwalk was constructed adjacent to the visitor centre in order to improve access to the reserve, as part of a partnership between the Nottinghamshire Wildlife Trust and the Rotary club of Retford.

== Geography ==
The reserve is over 3 miles (4.8 km) long from the northernmost tip to the southern base of the site and covers over 1,100 acres (450 ha). It is the largest wetland in Nottinghamshire and the fifth largest SSSI in the county, covering 790 acres (320 ha).

== Access and facilities ==
Idle Valley Nature Reserve is next to the A638 road and buses stop outside the reserve. Multiple public rights-of-way cross the reserve, including one around the majority of Bellmoor Lake. The reserve is open all year, and access is free, although visitors are asked to donate for using the car park. The main part of the reserve is accessed from the visitor centre. The northern end of the reserve can be accessed by walking from the visitor centre, although it is also accessible via Lound village.

The visitor centre and shop are open daily except Christmas Day. Most of the reserve and its facilities are wheelchair accessible, but some areas can be muddy and unsuitable for wheelchairs at times.

== Fauna and flora ==
=== Birds ===
The site contains a rich number of breeding wetland birds and a nationally important population of wintering gadwall, one of 17 species of wildfowl that can be regularly found at the site each year. Key breeding species include shoveler, great crested grebe and tufted duck, along with locally scarce breeding species such as wigeon and pochard. A number of breeding waders are also present, such as lapwing, Eurasian oystercatcher, little ringed plover and redshank. The gravel pits contain a large winter population of coot. 259 bird species have been recorded across the site, including nationally rare species. Recently, these have included a gull-billed tern in 2015 and blue-winged teal and lesser scaup in 2014.

=== Mammals ===
In 2021, Nottinghamshire Wildlife Trust announced it had plans to reintroduce beavers into the reserve, after the species had been absent from Nottinghamshire for over 400 years. A licence application for the reintroduction of beavers submitted by the Trust to Natural England was approved in June 2021.
