= Seller's Wood =

Protected area in Nottinghamshire, England

Coordinates: 53.004°N 1.222°W

Seller's Wood is a Site of Special Scientific Interest on the northern outskirts of Nottingham, England. There are several wildlife ponds within the site - formed out of old clay workings excavated by for use by local brickworks, long since closed. Entrance is from Sellers Wood Drive, Bulwell.

There is a circular walk of approximately 30 minutes with distant views and a view of the M1 motorway across farm fields from the northern edge.
