= Mr Straw's House =

Edwardian-era historic house museum in Worksop, England

Mr. Straw's House
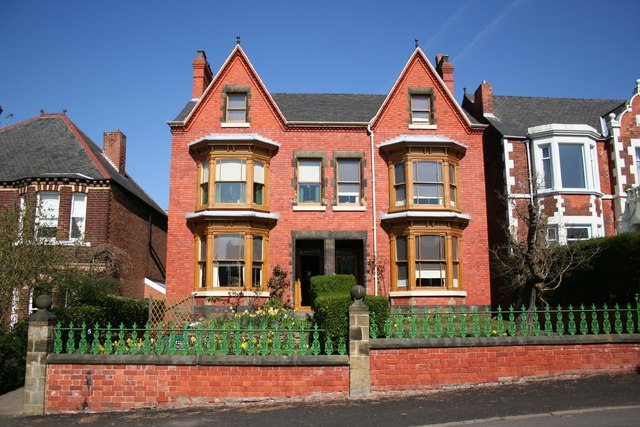
- Interactive map of the Mr. Straw's House area

General information
- Location: 5-7 Blyth Grove, Worksop, Nottinghamshire, England
- Coordinates: 53.3150°N 1.1154°W
- Completed: 1905
- Owner: National Trust

Website
- Mr Straws House

Mr Straw's House is a National Trust property in Worksop, Nottinghamshire, United Kingdom. The Edwardian semi-detached house and its contents have remained largely unchanged since the 1920s. It opened to the public in 1993. It has been called by one tour guide as "extraordinary" and one of "the best of Britain's hidden gems".

== History ==
The Edwardian semi-detached house built around 1905 and located on Blyth Grove in Worksop, was the residence of the Straw family and is now cared for by the National Trust. William Straw moved to the town in 1886 with his brother Benjamin and the two siblings established a successful grocers shop at 130 Bridge Street. The business, marketed as a tea dealer and seedsman as well as grocers, did well for itself, and on 15 September 1896, in Worksop Priory Church, William married Florence Ann Winks, daughter of the prosperous butcher and later councillor David Wall Winks, who owned the butchers across the street from the Straw's Grocery Shop. Having bought out his brother Benjamin in 1889, William was solely responsible for the business, living above the shop with Florence and their three sons, William (Jr) (1898), Walter (1899) and David (1901), who died at around eighteen months old in 1903.

It was not until 1923 that the family moved out to their new house on Blyth Grove and Florence quickly got to work on the decoration of her new home, choosing the latest wallpapers and carpets to create a fashionable and modern place for entertaining and relaxing. After living at the shop for so long the move to a separate family home was the chance to show off the success of the business. After the death of her husband in 1932 Florence made few alterations to the house, as a Victorian woman in mourning this would have been expected of her and her contemporaries would have found nothing strange about her choice to keep his pipes by the fire and his collar box in the bedroom. When she died in 1939 William and Walter lived in the house together, and their frugal way of living and make do and mend attitude resulted in the house largely avoiding modernisation.

William Jr had spent much of the 1920s and 1930s in London, initially studying English Literature at King's College London before going on to teach at City of London College. Moving home in 1939 he took over the running of the house, while his brother ran the family business until his retirement in 1962. Neither brother married but they both had a variety of hobbies and interests, including archaeology and walking, and were involved in various local societies and their chosen place of worship, St John's.

After Walter's death in 1976 William was alone until he died in 1990, the last few years of his life seeing him frequently in and out of hospital. When he died William generously left his collection of around 30,000 everyday objects from furniture to vintage tins food to the National Trust, along with his money. The family home on Blyth Grove, and the other half of the semidetached property (which William had bought around 1940 and rented out) were left to the last set of tenants. Luckily the tenants sold to the National Trust, enabling the collection to stay in the house just as the Straws lived with it, providing a fascinating glimpse into a forgotten time, clutter and all.

== National Trust ownership ==
Though the Straw family took good care of their home William was unable to keep on top of the upkeep in his later years and the time when the property was uninhabited at the end of William's life, saw the cold and damp have an inevitable effect on the property. With these issues resolved and the house rewired it was ready to receive visitors and the doors opened to the public in 1993.

Due to the small scale of the property visits need to be booked in advance as there is a maximum group size of four. The house is open on Thursdays and Fridays, closing for its winter clean at the end of October and reopening in March. The display room and theme changes annually.
