= Wilwell Farm Nature Reserve =

Nature reserve in Nottinghamshire, England

Coordinates: 52°54′30.00″N 1°9′30.00″W

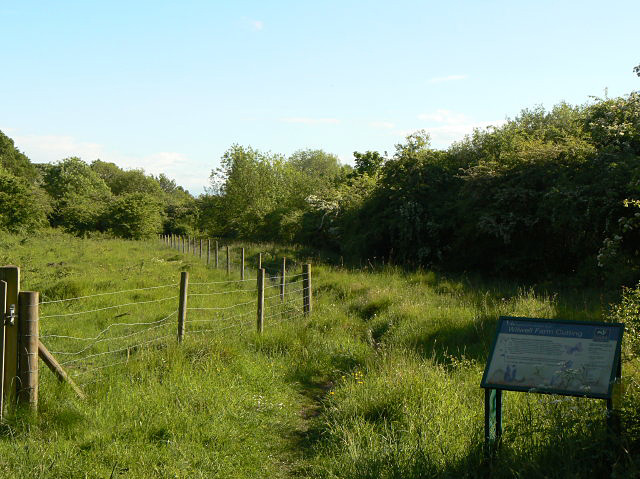
Wilwell Farm Cutting Nature Reserve

Wilwell Farm Nature Reserve or Wilwell Cutting is a biological Site of Special Scientific Interest and Local Nature Reserve in Nottinghamshire.

The site was originally standard farmland, but in the 1890s a cutting was constructed to take the Great Central Railway's London Extension. The site was located between Ruddington railway station (to the south) and Arkwright Street railway station (to the north). The Great Central Main Line was closed in 1969, and in 1976 it was proposed that the cutting should be used for landfill. However local opposition saw it converted into a Nature Reserve.
