= Mansfield Museum =

Local authority museum located in Mansfield, Nottinghamshire

Coordinates: 53.1458°N 1.1938°W

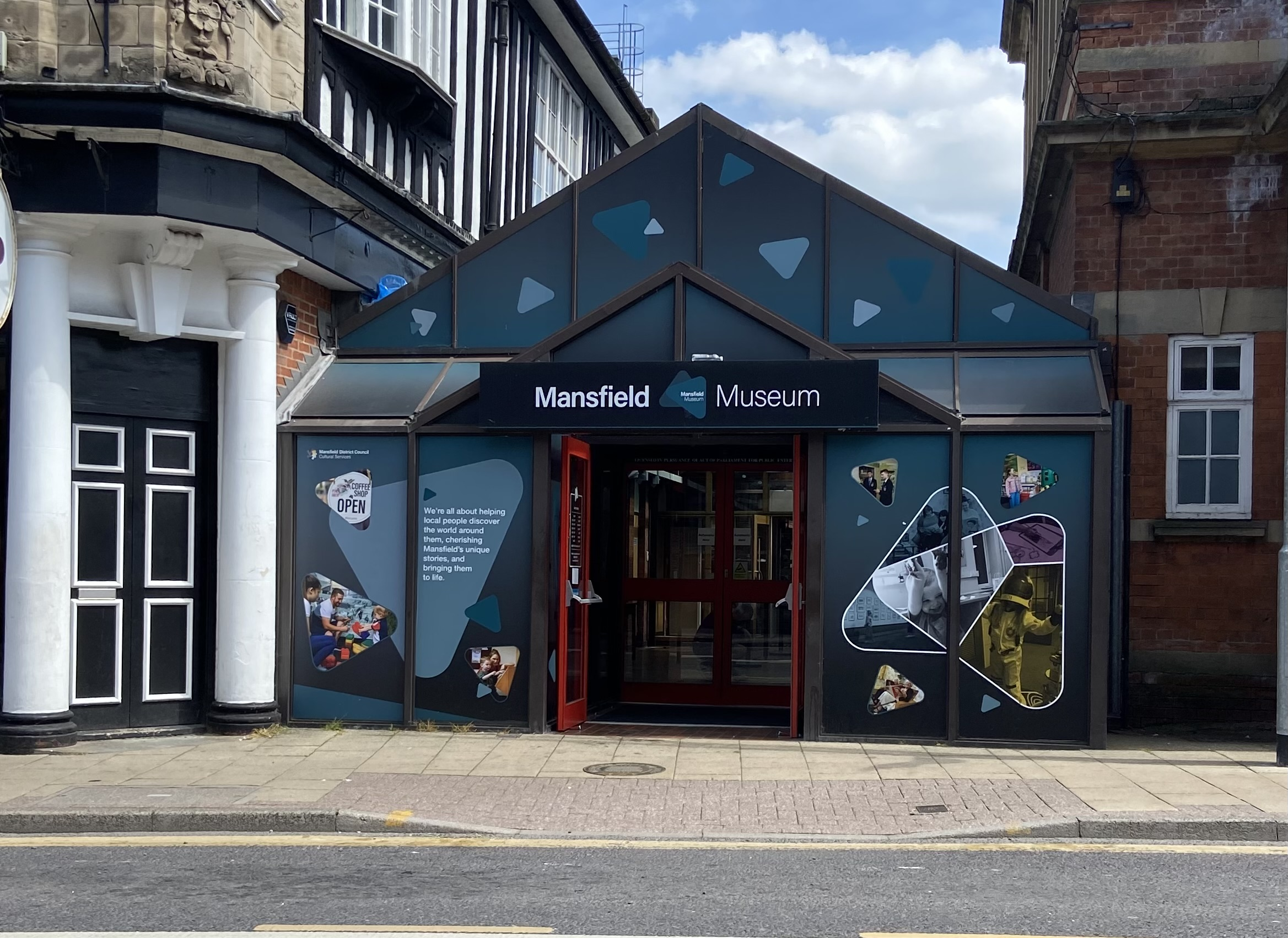
- Established: 1904
- Location: Leeming Street, Mansfield NG18 1NG, Nottinghamshire, England
- Website: https://www.mansfield.gov.uk/museum/

The Mansfield Museum is a local authority museum in Nottinghamshire run by Mansfield District Council. Mansfield Museum opened in 1904. Though the present building opened in 1938.

== History ==
Originally called the "Tin Tabernacle", the Museum was given to the town of Mansfield by the wealthy collector and natural historian, William Edward Baily in 1903. On his death he donated his collection and the building to house it. The following year the Museum was opened to the public on its current site on Leeming Street. Other prominent local people also added to the collection, including naturalist Joseph Whitaker and artist Albert Sorby Buxton.

The current building replaced the deteriorating tin tabernacle in 1938 and a fourth gallery was added in the 1960s.

== Collections ==
=== Made in Mansfield ===
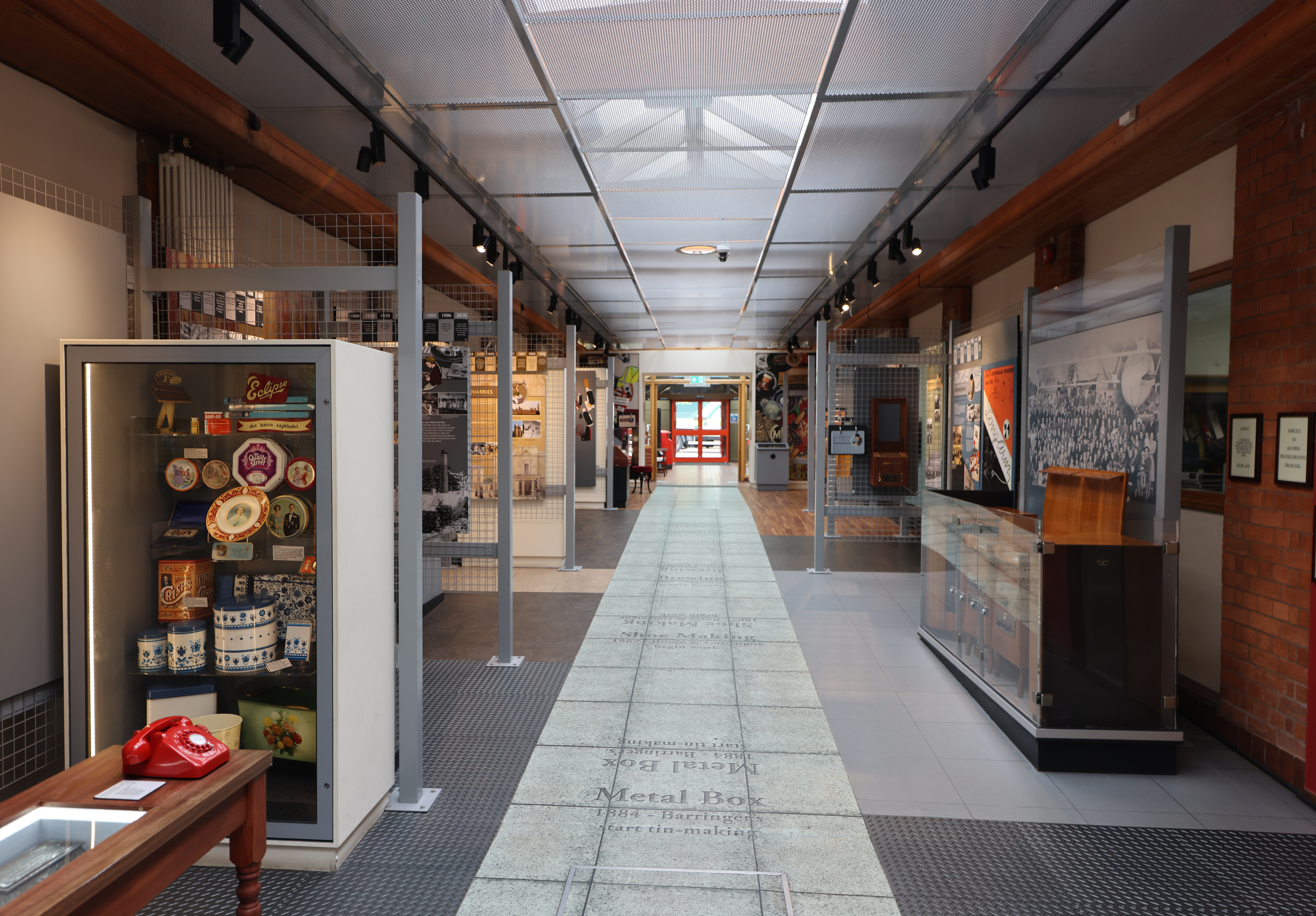
The made in Mansfield arcade

The Museum arcade holds an exhibition on eight of the more well-known industries that built Mansfield's reputation for manufacturing. The gallery features artefacts, photos, film and audio relating to the major, past and present employers of the town: Metal Box, Shoe Co, Mansfield Brewery, Barrs Soft Drinks, hosiery, precision engineering, mining, foundries and quarrying.

=== Albert Sorby Buxton ===
The museum holds the watercolour pictures of Mansfield painted by artist Albert Sorby Buxton. The pictures highlight buildings in Mansfield that no longer exist and views that have long since disappeared.

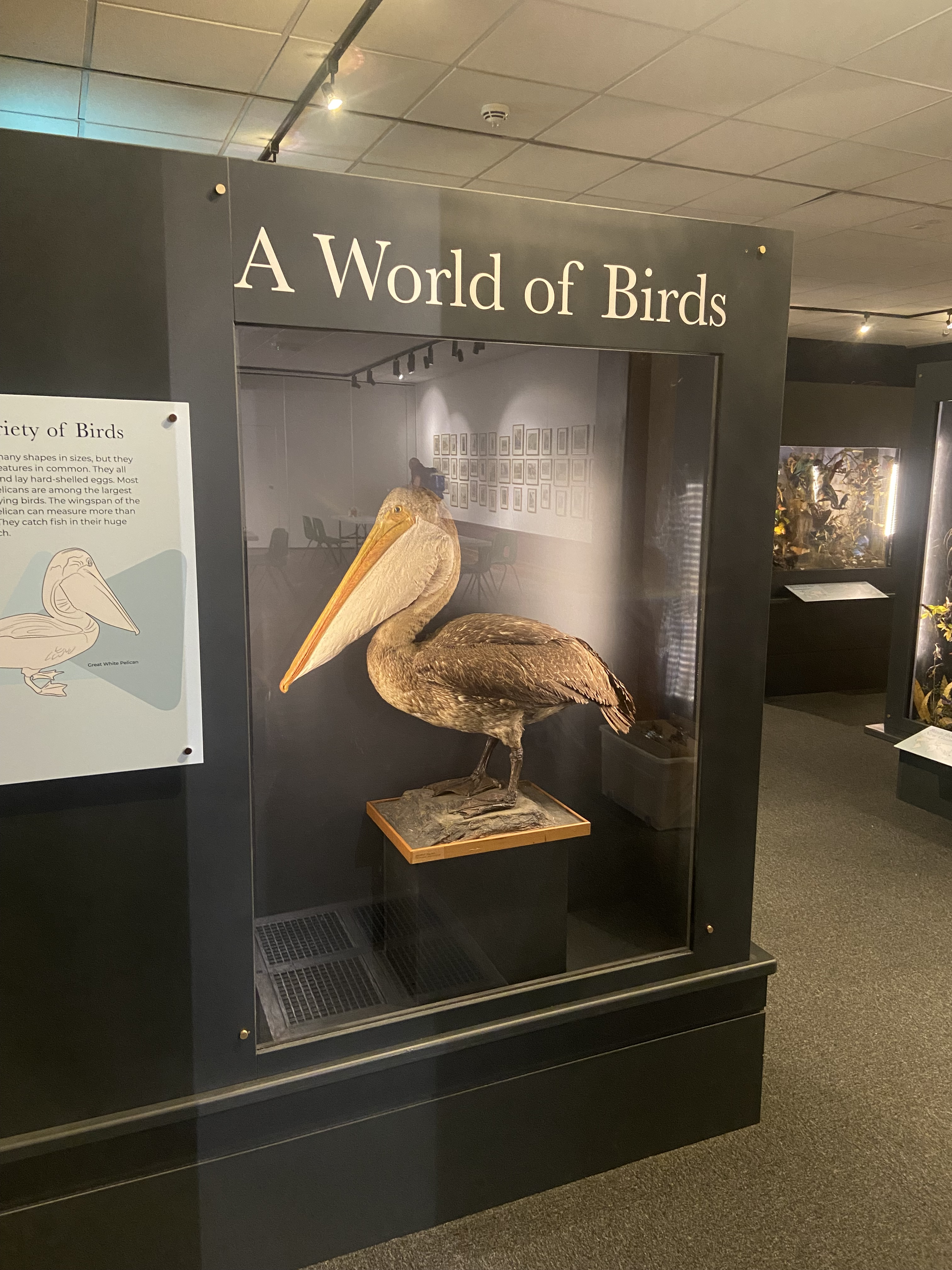
A World of Birds, Mansfield Museum

=== Ceramics ===
A gallery is dedicated to the ceramic works of William Billingsley and Rachel Manner's lustreware.

== Awards ==
The museum, with a focus on natural history, is known for being family friendly. The museum received an award from The Guardian newspaper in 2011 beating the Science Museum and the Natural History Museum in London.

Mansfield museum also won an award by the Museum Development East Midlands in 2019 with the best project on a shoestring for ‘Fitness, Food & Fun’.

The former curator of Mansfield museum Liz Weston received an MBE in 2013 for her services to heritage and the community.

In November 2025 the museum received two awards from the Museum Development Midlands Power of Place awards one for the Creative Collections Award in recognition of the World of Birds exhibition. The inclusive impact award was also given to Mansfield Museum for its work with disabled and vulnerable women.
