= D. H. Lawrence Birthplace Museum =

English writer's home

D.H. Lawrence Birthplace Museum
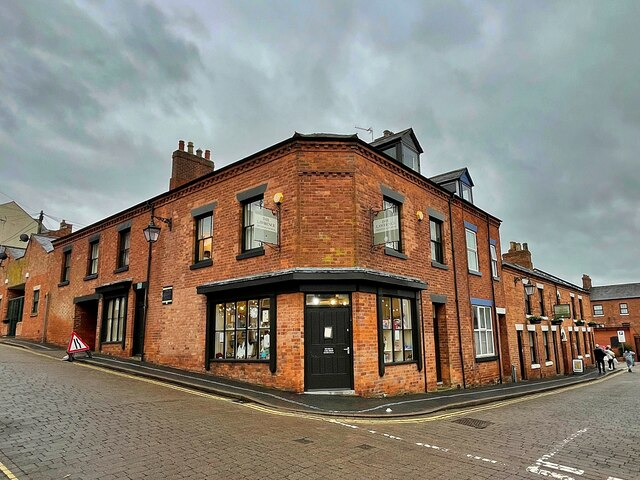
- From the entrance

- Location within Nottinghamshire
- Established: 1976
- Location: 8a Victoria Street, Eastwood, Nottingham NG16 3AW
- Coordinates: 53°01′07″N 1°18′25″W
- Type: Museum
- Founder: Enid Goodband
- Historian: Dr Andrew Harrison
- Owner: Broxtowe Borough Council
- Parking: Scargill Walk (Short Stay), Victoria Street (Long Stay).
- Website: www.broxtowe.gov.uk/dhlawrencemuseum

The D. H. Lawrence Birthplace Museum preserves the writer's home of D. H. Lawrence in Eastwood, near Nottingham. It is one of the four houses the family occupied in Eastwood. Now a museum, the building, which is the house in which he was born in 1885, has been conserved as a late-19th-century working-class miner's house. It permits visitors to take guided or self-guided tours through the author's early life. The house is a Grade II listed building.

== Exhibition ==
The house is presented as a late-19th-century working-class miner's house. Much of the furniture came from the family of the founder and first curator of the museum, Enid Goodband, although there are a few original items that belonged to the Lawrence's family. All artefacts are from as close to the 1880s as possible and from Nottinghamshire, so that they are authentic for the period. The house is set out as it was thought to have been when the Lawrences lived there. The significance of each room (parlour, kitchen, communal yard, washhouse, parents' bedroom, children's bedroom and attic) is highlighted, either by the interpretation boards on display, or via a staff member on a guided tour.

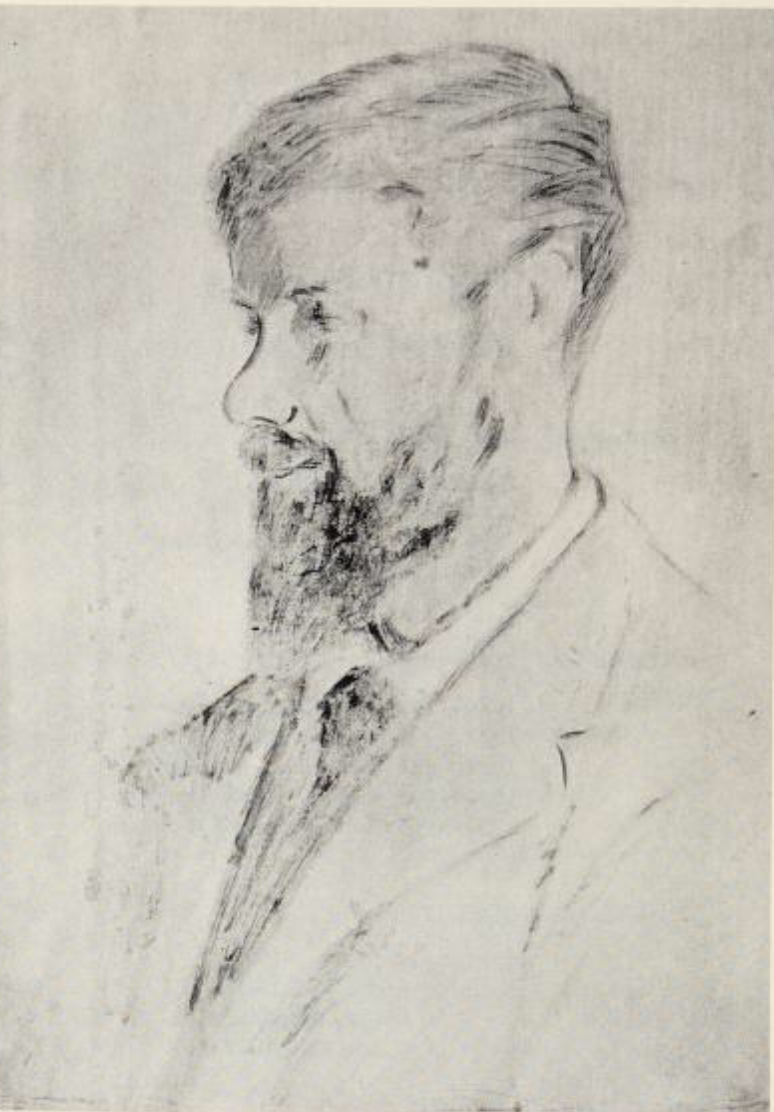
DH Lawrence Portrait in 1921

There is a small exhibition of Lawrence's early original watercolour paintings and a DVD room that starts the tour by providing an introduction to his life in Eastwood and thereafter. Photocopies of his later paintings are also displayed. A recent addition to the collection is Lawrence's original gravestone, which has been on display since 11 September 2009—the anniversary of his birthday.

== Heritage Centre ==
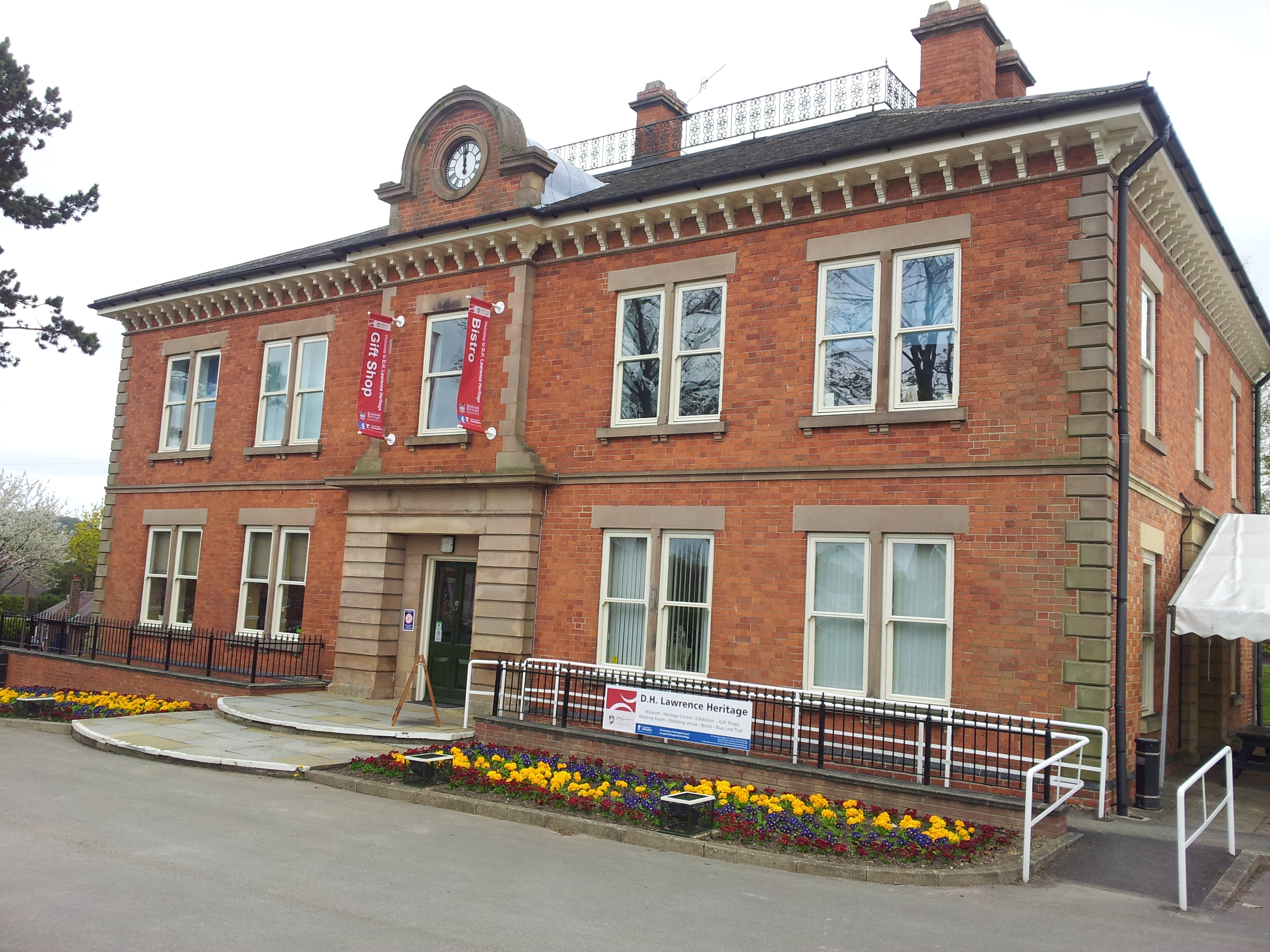
The Heritage Centre, May 2013

Prior to 2016, the Broxtowe Borough Council also supported the nearby D. H. Lawrence Heritage Centre (53.0218°N 1.3073°W; also known as Durban House Heritage Centre), which contained exhibitions about the social history of Eastwood and other facilities. In 2015, the council voted to close the building and merge the centre with the birthplace museum as a money-saving measure. The centre contained an exhibition on the social history of Eastwood during the time that the writer lived there, including information on the educational system, mining, trams, and retail shops, along with D. H. Lawrence and the people who were affiliated with him. In addition there was an art gallery, a bistro, conference rooms, and civil wedding, funeral, birthday and education facilities.
