= Roger de Busli =

Anglo-Norman Baron

Roger de Busli (c. 1038 – c. 1099) was a Norman baron who participated in the conquest of England in 1066.

== Life ==
Roger de Busli was born in or around 1038. His surname comes from the town now known as Bully (near Neufchâtel-en-Bray, mentioned as Buslei ar. 1060, Busli 12th century.) in Normandy, and he was likely born there. Busli was given lands in Nottinghamshire, Derbyshire and the Strafforth wapentake of Yorkshire. These had previously belonged to a variety of Anglo-Saxons, including Edwin, Earl of Mercia.

By the time of the Domesday survey de Busli was tenant-in-chief of 86 manors in Nottinghamshire, 46 in Yorkshire, and others in Derbyshire, Lincolnshire, and Leicestershire, plus one in Devon. They became the Honour of Blyth (later renamed the Honour of Tickhill), and within it, de Busli erected numerous castles, at Tickhill, Kimberworth, Laughton-en-le-Morthen, and Mexborough. In 1088, he founded Blyth Priory.

Much of the de Busli's family's leverage came from their familial relationships with the crown through the Counts of Eu. Roger de Busli's wife Muriel was in favour with the queen, to whom she was probably a lady-in-waiting or a kinswoman, evident in the queen's grant to de Busli of the manor of Sandford upon his marriage. The de Buslis had one son, also called Roger, who died as an infant, thus leaving no heirs. His daughter (or possibly his sister) Beatrix, (also known as Beatrice de Builli), married William, Count of Eu.

De Busli died in the last years of the 11th century without an heir. His lands were given to Robert de Bellême, who lost them in 1102 after he led a rebellion against Henry I of England. Ernulf de Busli, probably Roger's brother, may then have inherited some of the lands; these were then passed to Ernulf's son Jordan and grandson Richard de Busli. Richard de Busli was co-founder of Roche Abbey, South Yorkshire with Richard FitzTurgis in 1147. The male line of the de Busli family died out in 1213, and their holdings passed into the Vipont family through the marriage of Idonea de Busli with Robert de Vipont (Vieuxpont).

== Sources ==
- The Origins of Some Anglo-Norman Families, Lewis C. Loyd, 1951
- Roger de Busli and his Descendants
- The Aristocracy of Norman England, Judith A. Green, Cambridge University Press, 1997
- Wentworth Family Genealogy: English and American, John Wentworth, Boston, Little, Brown & Co., 1878
- Pedigree of de Busli and Vipont
