= Harworth Colliery =

Coal mine in Nottinghamshire, England

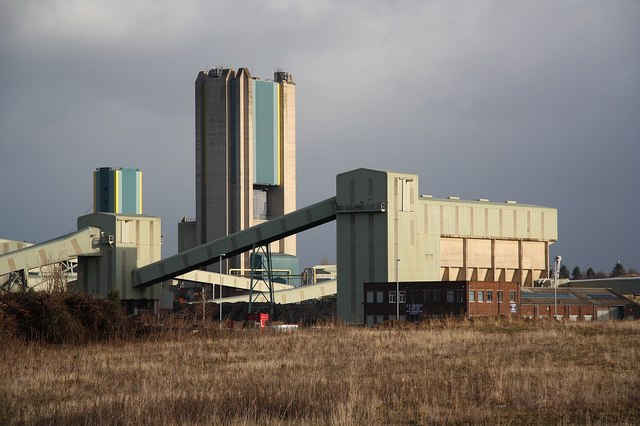
- Harworth Colliery in December 2009

- Location in Nottinghamshire
- Location: Harworth, Bassetlaw, Nottinghamshire, Nottinghamshire, England; 53°24′54″N 1°03′40″W
- Products: Coal
- Opened: 1913
- Closed: 2006
- Company: UK Coal (former owner), Harworth Group (current owner)

Harworth Colliery was a colliery near the town of Harworth Bircotes in Bassetlaw, Nottinghamshire, England.

It was abandoned in 2006 due to troubles at the seam. UK Coal, who owned and maintained the mine, were waiting for a contract to make it worth investing money to open up a new seam. Bassetlaw has at the moment no working pits; the nearest was Maltby Main Colliery in South Yorkshire which closed in 2013.

The mothballing of the pit in 2006 brought an end to 86 years of mining in Bassetlaw.

The area has since been redeveloped by Harworth Group for retail, industrial and residential.

== History ==
Work began on sinking the shaft in 1913, when the Northern Union Mining Company was set up. This was with an investment in German equipment and men, but with the start of the First World War (1914-1918) the German workers were interned and the company's assets were impounded by the Government, and so construction was halted.

Later in 1917 the pit was bought by Messrs. Barber, Walker & Co. for £80,100, becoming full owners in 1921 after the war repayments scheme. The sinking of the shafts was started with preliminary works in 1919, but the first real sinking started in 1921. Water problems were encountered but this was overcome with the solidification of the ground with liquid cement grout. On 29 October 1923 the shaft sinkers eventually reached the Barnsley seam at 848 metres (2,782 ft) although there were problems with underground faults. The second shaft also reached the Barnsley seam on 15 November 1923.

In 1924 the colliery was connected with a 4.2 km railway line to connect with the London & North Eastern Railway (LNER) owned East Coast Main Line (ECML). The main structure on the line was the 256 ft (78 m), 6 span 26 ft (7.9 m) high viaduct across the River Ryton. The ECML became very congested and a connection the South Yorkshire Joint Railway (SYJR) was considered, also linking the new Firbeck Colliery (sinking started in 1923) near Carlton in Lindrick. A triangle junction would lead to another triangle junction near Styrrup with lines going to Harworth and another going through Oldcotes and Langold to reach Firbeck. The forecast for Harworth was 5000 tons per day; this would have meant more congestion, so the opportunity was taken by the new owners on the SYJR (LNER and the LMS) to build the line to connect both collieries. This was completed in 1928.

There were also several Coke ovens at Harworth, and like Maltby Main Colliery it was decided to modernise the pit in the 1950s. Rebuilding with the concrete headgears began in the late 1950s.

These structures were replaced with the current headgears in 1989 (No 1 Shaft) and 1994 (No 2 Shaft). Shortly after the No 1 Headgears were built the new surface main mine fan was also commissioned to efficiently ventilate the workings.

== Uses of the coal ==
The coal early on was from the Barnsley seam, the top layer being good for steaming and the lower parts for house and coking (mix). Harworth coal was in great demand from railway companies like the LNER. The Flying Scotsman locomotive, one of the most famous steam engines in the world (now owned by the National Railway Museum) was burning Harworth coal when it covered the 392 miles from London to Edinburgh in a record seven hours and 27 minutes in 1932.

With the decline of steam power in the late 1960s and coal being used less for gas and heating the coal began to be used for producing power. Power stations like Drax and Cottam used Harworth coal, this being transported by the SYJR. Other lower seams included the Parkgate seam.

== Recent history ==
In more recent history, Harworth reached the one-million-tonnes-in-a-year figure in 1993.

The pit's closure was considered in November 2002 when owners UK Coal warned the 400 workers the pit was in trouble unless yearly losses of £8 million could be reversed. Three years later, to save the pit, the only possible solution for the 450 workers was to invest £50 million to access a new seam. If that was to happen the pit would have up to 25 more years worth of coal.

Profits at UK Coal increased nearly fourfold in one year as the company benefited from property sales, higher coal prices and smoother mining operations.

UK Coal, which operated four deep collieries and several surface mines, reported that pre-tax profits had jumped by 292% to £69 million in the year 2007. On 21 April 2008, UK Coal said it was to consider plans to reopen Harworth colliery, and also investing £100m to extend the lives of the Thoresby Colliery in Nottinghamshire and Kellingley Colliery in Yorkshire.

In 2008 work started underground at Harworth Colliery to make good several kilometres of roadway and infrastructure to enable access to the millions of tonnes of coal that remain to be mined. Also a team of experts was assembled at the groups HQ tasked with planning the methods of accessing the remaining coal however in April 2016 the Harworth colliery was demolished to make way for housing.

In 2017, plans were announced by Harworth Group to build 1,200 homes at the site. The development was named Simpson Park, named after former world champion cyclist and local resident Tom Simpson.
