= Leeds (Whitehall Road) power station =

Former power station in England

- Country: England
- Location: Leeds
- Coordinates: 53°47′43″N 01°33′07″W
- Status: Decommissioned and demolished
- Construction began: 1889
- Commission date: 1893
- Decommission date: 1960s
- Owners: Yorkshire House-to-House Electricity Company Limited (1889–1898); Leeds Corporation (1898–1948); British Electricity Authority (1948–1955); Central Electricity Authority (1955–1957); Central Electricity Generating Board (1958–1970)
- Operator: As owner

Thermal power station
- Primary fuel: Coal
- Turbine technology: Steam turbines
- Cooling source: River water

Power generation
- Units operational: 1 x 12 MW, 1 x 10 MW, 1 x 15 MW
- Make and model: British Thomson- Houston and Parsons
- Nameplate capacity: 37 MW
- Annual net output: 46.57 GWh (1946)

Leeds power station, also known as Whitehall Road power station, supplied electricity to the city of Leeds and the surrounding area from 1893 to 1965. It was initially built, owned and operated by the Yorkshire House-to-House Electricity Company Limited. Leeds Corporation took over the electricity undertaking in 1898 and generated and distributed electricity until the nationalisation of the British electricity supply industry in 1948. The power station was redeveloped several times to meet increasing demand for electricity.

== History ==
Leeds town council had conducted experiments with electric lighting in the mid-1880s. The council had rejected a proposal in 1889 to provide electricity to the public as being too speculative. The Yorkshire House-to-House Electricity Company Limited (registered on 26 June 1889) applied for a provisional order under the Electric Lighting Acts to generate and supply electricity to the city. The Leeds Electric Supply Order 1891 was granted by the Board of Trade and was confirmed by Parliament through the Electric Lighting Orders Confirmation (No. 12) Act 1891 (54 & 55 Vict. c. cvi).

The company established a successful electricity supply system including a power station at Whitehall Road (53°47′43″N 1°33′07″W). Electricity was first supplied in May 1893. In 1898 Leeds Corporation resolved to purchase the undertaking under clause 59 of the company's provisional order. The purchase price offer was 40 percent above the cost of the company’s system, and the transfer of ownership took place in 1898.

== Equipment specification ==
=== Plant in 1898 ===
The original plant at Leeds power station comprised compound and vertical condensing engines coupled directly and by ropes to Lowrie-Parker and Hall dynamos, and Ferranti and ECC alternators. In 1898 the generating capacity was 1,500 kW and the maximum load was 1,010 kW.

In 1902 two English Electric Construction 1,500 kW alternators were installed one driven by a McLaren steam engine the other from Belliss. They were amongst the biggest triple expansion high speed steam engines at the time.

=== Plant in 1923 ===
By 1923 the generating plant comprised:

- Coal-fired boilers generating up to 996,800 lb/h (126 kg/s) of steam, which was supplied to:
- Generators:
  - 2 × 3,000 kW steam turbo-alternators
  - 3 × 6,000 kW steam turbo-alternators
  - 2 × 7,500 kW steam turbo-alternators
  - 1 × 12,000 kW steam turbo-alternator

These machines gave a total generating capacity of 51 MW of alternating current.

The electricity supply available to consumers was:

- 2- phase, 50 Hz AC at 100, 200 and 400 Volts
- 3-phase, 50 Hz AC at 346 and 200 Volts.

=== Plant in 1955 ===
By 1955 the plant at Whitehall Road comprised:

- Boilers:
  - 14 × Babcock & Wilcox boilers with chain grate stokers and a total capacity of 480,000 lb/h (60.5 kg/s), steam conditions 185 psi and 550°F (12.8 bar, 288°C), supplied to:
- Turbo-alternators:
  - 1 × 12 MW British Thomson-Houston turbo-alternator
  - 1 × 10 MW British Thomson-Houston turbo-alternator
  - 1 × 15 MW Parsons turbo-alternators

The total installed generating capacity was 37 MW.

Condenser cooling water was drawn from the adjacent River Aire.

== Operations ==
In 1898 the amount of electricity sold to the 576 consumers was 833,280 kWh. There was estimated to be the equivalent of 49,150 (8 candle power) lamps on the circuits.

=== Operating data 1921–23 ===
The operating data for the period 1921–23 was:

Leeds power station operating data 1921–23
Electricity Use	Units	Year		
Electricity Use	Units	1921	1922	1923
Lighting and domestic use	MWh	12,454	13,609	15.918
Public lighting use	MWh	265	311	434
Traction	MWh	8,141	8,109	7,532
Power use	MWh	43,061	36,341	43,099
Bulk supply	MWh	0	456	4,955
Total use	MWh	63,922	58,826	71,937
Load and connected load
Maximum load	kW	29,090	30,830	36,400
Total connections	kW	96,538	104,050	114,166
Load factor	Per cent	28.3	25.3	26.1
Financial
Revenue from sales of current	£	–	508,280	525,688
Surplus of revenue over expenses	£	–	242,192	330,195

Under the terms of the Electricity (Supply) Act 1926 (16 & 17 Geo. 5. c. 51) the Central Electricity Board (CEB) was established in 1926. The CEB identified high efficiency ‘selected’ power stations that would supply electricity most effectively; Leeds was designated a selected station. The CEB also constructed the National Grid (1927–33) to connect power stations within a region.

=== Operating data 1946 ===
Leeds power station operating data in 1946 was:

Leeds power station operating data, 1946
Year	Load factor per cent	Max output load MW	Electricity supplied MWh	Thermal efficiency per cent
1946	18.5	28,720	46,569	10.89

=== Nationalisation ===
The British electricity supply industry was nationalised in 1948 under the provisions of the Electricity Act 1947 (10 & 11 Geo. 6. c. 54). The Leeds electricity undertaking was abolished, ownership of Leeds power station was vested in the British Electricity Authority, and subsequently the Central Electricity Authority and the Central Electricity Generating Board (CEGB). At the same time the electricity distribution and sales responsibilities of the Leeds electricity undertaking were transferred to the Yorkshire Electricity Board (YEB).

=== Operating data 1954–63 ===
Operating data for the period 1954–63 was:

Leeds power station operating data, 1954–63
Year	Running hours or load factor (per cent)	Max output capacity MW	Electricity supplied GWh	Thermal efficiency per cent
1954	1423	34	12.522	10.49
1955	1596	34	16.880	11.51
1956	1490	34	12.209	11.73
1957	1019	34	7.700	11.55
1958	1079	34	7.501	10.37
1961	(6.3 %)	34	18.652	10.76
1962	(6.1%)	34	18.144	10.26
1963	(5.81 %)	34	17.309	8.92

Leeds was an electricity supply district, covering 87 square miles (225 km^{2}) and including the city and county borough of Leeds, the borough of Morley and part of the district of Rothwell with a total population of 562,000 in 1958. The number of consumers and electricity sold in the Leeds district was:

Year	1956	1957	1958
Number of consumers	192,355	194,119	196,743
Electricity sold GWh	631,297	665,873	196,743

== Closure ==
Leeds (Whitehall Road) power station was decommissioned in the late 1960s. The buildings were subsequently used as a CEGB training centre for many years until final closure. The building has been demolished and the area has been redeveloped with commercial premises.

== See also ==
- Timeline of the UK electricity supply industry
- List of power stations in England
- Kirkstall power station
