= Listed buildings in Harworth Bircotes =

Harworth Bircotes is a civil parish in the Bassetlaw District of Nottinghamshire, England. The parish contains eight listed buildings that are recorded in the National Heritage List for England. All the listed buildings are designated at Grade II, the lowest of the three grades, which is applied to "buildings of national importance and special interest". The parish contains the settlements of Harworth and Bircotes, and the surrounding area. All the listed buildings are in Harworth, and they consist of a church, a war memorial in the churchyard, a house, farmhouses and barns.

== Buildings ==
Name and location	Photograph	Date	Notes
All Saints' Church, Harworth; 53.41879°N 1.07817°W		12th century	The oldest part of the church is the tower, the rest of it was rebuilt and extended in 1869–70. The church is built in stone with slate roofs, and consists of a nave, a south porch, north and south transepts, a chancel with a north organ chamber and vestry, and a west tower. The tower has three stages, on a plinth, with diagonal buttresses, string courses, two gargoyles, and an embattled parapet with eight crocketed pinnacles. There is a three-light west window with a hood mould, stair lights, and two-light bell openings. There are also embattled parapets on the body of the church.
High Farmhouse; 53.41720°N 1.07545°W		1742	The farmhouse is rendered, and has a floor band, an eaves band, dogtooth eaves, and a pantile roof with red brick coped gables and kneelers. There are two storeys and an L-shaped plan, with a front range of three bays. In the centre is a doorway, the windows are horizontally-sliding sashes, and all the openings are under segmental arches. Above the doorway is a plaque containing a decorative shield with initials and the date.
Grange Farmhouse; 53.41651°N 1.07452°W	—	Late 18th century	The farmhouse is in red brick on a plinth, with an eaves band, dogtooth eaves, and a hipped pantile roof. There are two storeys and an L-shaped plan, with a front range of six bays. The doorway has a fanlight, the windows are sashes, and all the openings have splayed brick lintels.
Syringa House; 53.41774°N 1.07896°W		Late 18th century	The house is in red brick, with dogtooth eaves and a hipped pantile roof. There are two storeys and an L-shaped plan, with a front range of three bays. The central doorway has a fanlight, the windows are sashes, and all the openings have splayed brick lintels.
Willow Barn; 53.41714°N 1.07517°W		Late 18th century	The barn is in red brick, with dentilled eaves, and a pantile roof with brick coped gables and kneelers. There are two storeys and a loft, and in the centre is a large carriageway with a flat head. The barn also contains windows, slit vents, and vents in a diamond pattern.
Dovecote Barn; 53.41729°N 1.07492°W		Early 19th century	The barn is in red brick, with an eaves band, dogtooth eaves, and a hipped pantile roof. There are two storeys and five bays. In the centre is a large carriageway under a segmental arch with an inscribed keystone. On the front are six recessed panels containing vents in a diamond pattern, and two casement windows.
Barn, Syringa House; 53.41752°N 1.07964°W		Early 19th century	The barn is in red brick, with dogtooth eaves, a pantile roof and two storeys. It contains a large carriageway under a segmental arch, and slit vents. To the right, and slightly recessed, is a single-storey wing with three bays.
Harworth War Memorial and walls 53.41749°N 1.07597°W		1926	The war memorial stands in an enclosure with low stone walls. It is in Cornish granite, and consists of an obelisk on a plinth, on a square base. On the obelisk is a date and a carved laurel wreath, and on the plinth is an inscription and the names of those lost in the two World Wars.
