= Wyke Beck =

Stream in West Yorkshire, England

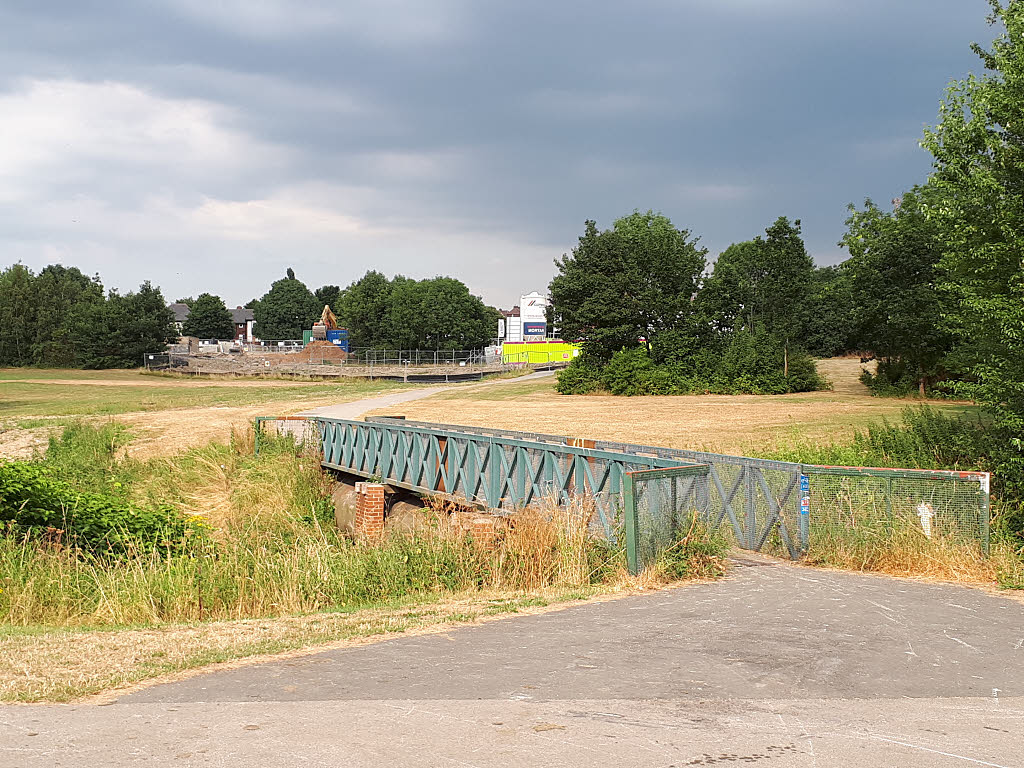
- Footbridge over the Wyke Beck

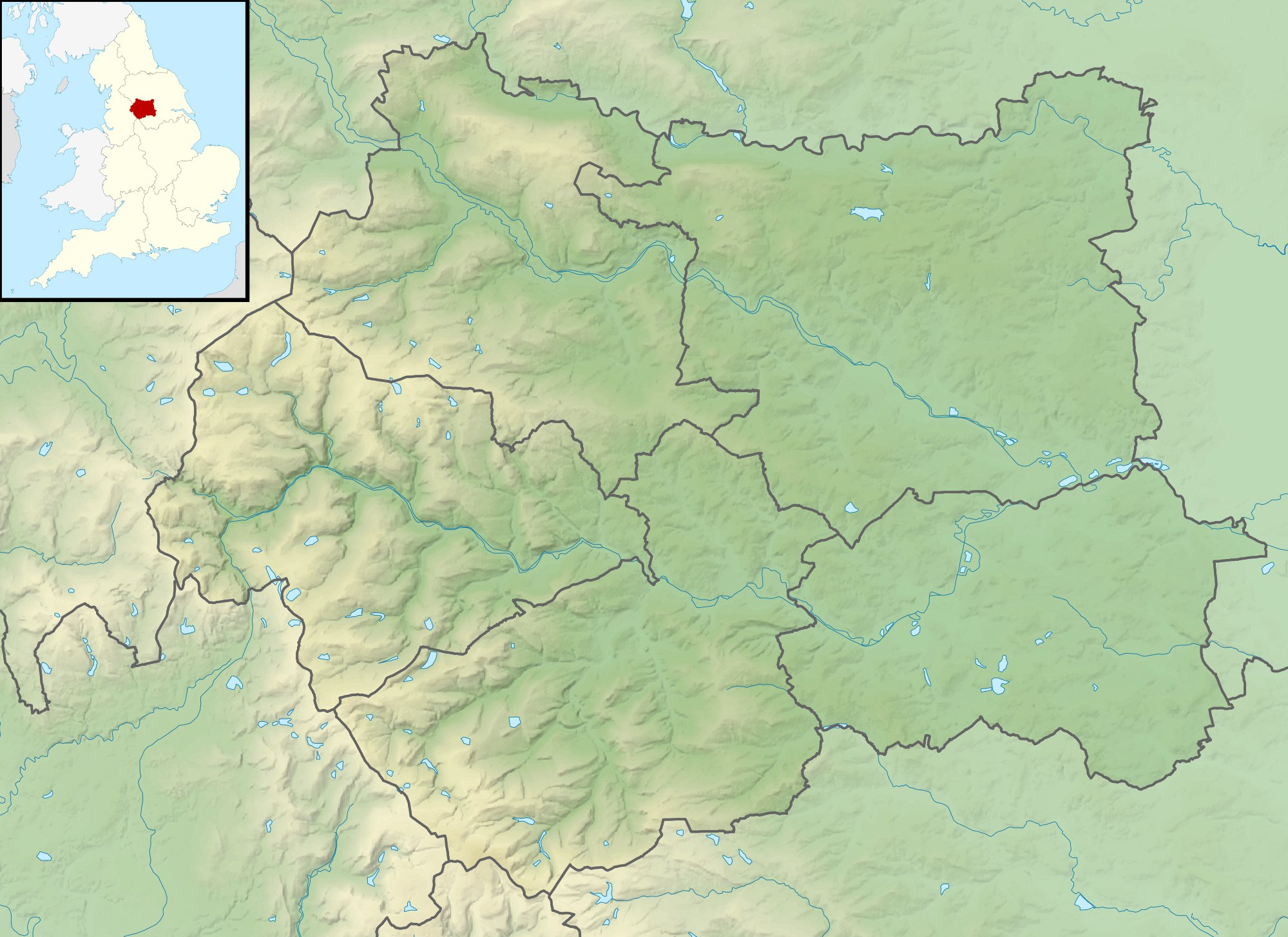
- Location within West Yorkshire

Location
- Country: England
- County: West Yorkshire
- City: Leeds

Physical characteristics
- Source: Waterloo Lake
  - location: Roundhay Park, Leeds
  - coordinates: 53.831°N 1.493°W
  - elevation: 490 feet (150 m)
- Mouth: River Aire
  - location: Skelton Lake
  - coordinates: 53.766°N 1.475°W
  - elevation: 66 feet (20 m)
- Length: 6.2 miles (10 km)

Wyke Beck is a stream that runs from Roundhay Park to the River Aire in east Leeds, West Yorkshire, England. Described as an Urban Beck, the stream flows through housing estates and then an industrial landscape in its lower reaches. Wyke Beck has been prone to flooding so often, that remediation of its course and flood storage schemes have been initiated by Leeds City Council.

The Wyke Beck is a green corridor through east Leeds and flows through, or near, five local nature reserves. Industrial development in its lower reaches has had an impact on the beck and future developments may also mean a reduction in sites for wildlife. A proposal to site a railway depot in the Temple Green/Knostrop area, has been identified as potentially damaging to a colony of white-clawed crayfish.

== Description ==
The stream starts as an outflow of Waterloo Lake in Roundhay Park, Leeds. The lake, which covers 33 acres (13 ha) and is 60 feet (18 m) deep, was previously a quarry which was adapted into a feature of the park by unemployed soldiers who had returned from the Napoleonic Wars, hence the name of the lake. The beck heads in a southerly direction under the A58 road and through Gipton, under the A64 road and the Leeds to York Railway Line before circumnavigating the park at Primrose Valley by passing to the west.

Below the B6159 (and latterly, the A63 road), the beck flows through an industrial landscape, which historically polluted the beck. The site of Meadowfield Primary School was in use as Wyke Beck Colliery until 1951.

The watercourse was diverted in 1914 in conjunction with the opening of the sewage works at Knostrop. The proposals to build the depot for HS2 trains at Knostrop (part of the Gateway 45 project) would see the beck diverted again with work expected to take six months. Wyke Beck originally flowed through what is the site of Skelton Lake; at some point the River Aire was straightened, and the beck diverted to enter the river a little further south.

As the beck flows through the populated areas in east Leeds, it is described as an urban beck.

== Flooding ==
The beck has been described as a main tributary of the River Aire, and has flooded many times in the 21st century, most notably in 2004, 2005, and 2007. The flooding is a combination of several factors; usually intense rainfall is the cause, but secondary effects are the amount of litter dumped into the stream and the developments built near to, or over, the beck. Yorkshire Water have installed storm tanks in Wykebeck Valley Road, and Gipton, which are designed to prevent flash flood water and sanitary waste entering Wyke Beck.

In August 2008, the level of the beck rose by 3-foot-3-inch (1 m) in 15 minutes, requiring the fire brigade to be called in to pump water away from the A64 road. Peak flooding reached a level of 5 feet 7 inches (1.7 m) on the Dunhills Estate in 2017, after sirens were sounded to warn of flooding to properties. A gauging weir at Gipton recorded the highest level ever in June 2007 as being 6 feet 6 inches (1.99 m).

== Recreation and LNRs ==
The course of the beck is shadowed by the Wykebeck Way, which follows the beck south as far as Temple Newsam. The beck flows either through, or alongside, five Local Nature Reserves; Wykebeck Woods and Asket Hill, Arthur’s Rein, Killingbeck Fields, Primrose Valley, and Halton Moor. A proposal to link the Wyke Beck Way with Rothwell Country Park by putting bridges across the River Aire and the Aire and Calder Navigation came to fruition in 2017 with the installation of the Skelton Bridge.

Flooding on the Wyke Beck has been problematic for properties below Killingbeck Meadows LNR, so in 2019, a programme was undertaken to provide flooding control and storage at Killingbeck Meadows. The programme was part of a £4.75 million scheme to help the local environment. Further applications to create dams and wetlands in the Killingbeck LNR were made in May 2020. The flood area at Killingbeck fields can hold 880,000 cubic feet (25,000 m^{3}), which combined with the 2020 impounding application, can be increased to 1,600,000 cubic feet (45,000 m^{3}).

== Hydrology and wildlife ==
The water quality of the beck has been recorded as Moderate for ecological status and Good for its chemical composition. In the early 2010s, the Wyke Beck was failing on its chemical status. The Environment Agency has set a target of 2027 for the beck to be registered as having an overall quality of Good. The adjacent Knostrop Sewage Works near to the beck's mouth, has historically discharged treated wastewater into the beck. Diesel spills have been reported on the beck; one was in October 1991, with another in April 2018 that also polluted a 6 miles (9.7 km) stretch of the River Aire. A company from Surrey was fined £15,000 for allowing raw sewage to enter the beck in 2003 and kill crayfish. They had been installing a new sewer for Yorkshire Water. The beck was also polluted with an insecticide in 2017, which was rated as "exceed[ing] chronic pollution levels for neonicotinoids".

Water voles, European bullhead, trout and white-clawed crayfish are known to have been present on the beck. The population of native crayfish in the beck (and also at nearby Meanwood Beck) has been described as strong, so much so that some were removed to Pudsey Beck to form an ark. The habitat for all of these is under threat from the proposed development of the rolling stock depot (RSD) at Gateway 45 for the HS2 line into Leeds. The proposals include more culverting and drainage, which would result in "...permanent adverse effects... on the watercourse".
