= Stourton, Leeds =

Area of Leeds, West Yorkshire, England

Coordinates: 53.770°N 1.508°W

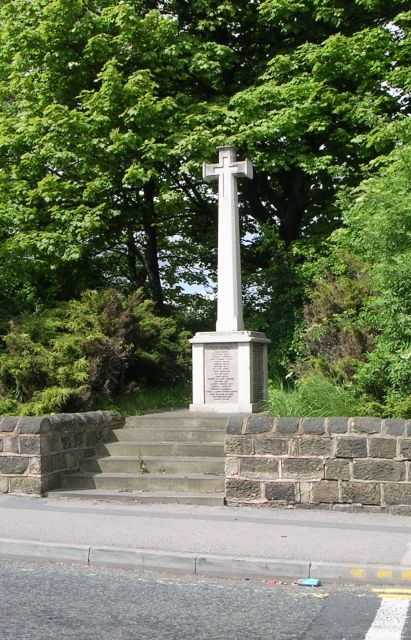
Stourton war memorial

Stourton is a mainly industrial area of the city of Leeds, West Yorkshire, England. The area falls within the City and Hunslet ward of Leeds Metropolitan Council.

== Location ==
The area is two miles (3.2 km) to the south-east of Leeds city centre, between Hunslet, the M1 motorway and Cross Green in the LS10 postcode area.

== History ==
Until the local boundary changes in the 1970s Stourton was a village in the Rothwell Urban District, attached to the southernmost border of Leeds, and administered by the West Riding County Council. Stourton dates from the Industrial Revolution, and was a community of about 2,500 people with its own churches and pubs, but from the 1970s the housing was demolished to make way for motorways and industrial developments, until by 1990 little remained of the village except its war memorial. This memorial to "the men of Stourton and Thwaitegate" lists 75 names from the First World War and 25 from the Second. It was moved from its original site to a new one donated by Waddingtons in about 1973, when its previous home, St Andrew's Church, Pontefract Road, was demolished. One of the men named on the cenotaph is CQMS Denis Gill MM and Bar, York and Lancaster Regiment, who was killed in action on 5 January 1944 at Cassino, Italy. He is buried in the Cassino War Cemetery.

== Industry ==
Stourton used to provide electricity for Leeds and the surrounding areas from the Skelton Grange power station until it was demolished in 1995. Its associated substation remains in use however. The site is next to the Gateway 45 development and in 2019 it was selected to be a maintenance depot for the High Speed 2 railway.

The village was home to some significant industry: John Waddingtons, Yorkshire Copperworks, Camerons Iron Works, Concrete Northern (Bison) were among the larger companies, as well as a not insignificant railway shunting yard.

== Freightliner terminal ==
There is a substantial railfreight intermodal terminal at Stourton operated by Freightliner (UK). It has eight departures and arrivals on most days, going to and from Southampton, Felixstowe and London Gateway. There is also a thrice-weekly feeder service to Tees Dock, which conveys containers from Southampton services. Intermodal trains to and from Stourton are often used to bring locomotives to the Freightliner Group's Depot at nearby Midland Road in Hunslet for maintenance and repair.
