= Prince of Wales Colliery =

Former colliery in West Yorkshire, England

- Location within West Yorkshire
- Location: Pontefract, West Yorkshire, England; 53.704°N 1.319°W
- Products: Coal
- Discovered: 1860
- Opened: 1870
- Closed: 2002
- Company: Alderman Rhodes, 1872–1896; Lord Masham, 1896–? National Coal Board, 1947–1994; RJB Mining, 1994–2001; UK Coal, 2001–2002; Harworth Group 2002-present

The Prince of Wales Colliery was a coal mine that operated for over 130 years in Pontefract, West Yorkshire, England. It was permanently closed in 2002 after geological problems were found to make accessing remaining coal reserves unprofitable, and most of the site was later converted for housing.

== History ==
The colliery was developed from 1860, but coaling operations did not begin until 1869, with full production underway by 1872, when over 600 tonnes (660 tons) was being brought to the surface per week. It was sometimes referred to as PoW or as the Ponty Prince, Ponty being short for Pontefract, the town that it was in. In 1885, the underground viewer, general manager and the owner of the mine (Alderman Rhodes, the Mayor of Pontefract) were prosecuted for not ensuring that the pit was adequately ventilated. A regulation stipulated that the air sections should be a minimum of 18 feet (5.5 m) wide, but those at the PoW were only 10 feet (3 m), 11 feet (3.4 m) and 14 feet (4.3 m). The underground viewer and general manager were fined, with the mayor being told to ensure the safe working of his mine. Two years later, in 1887, Rhodes appointed Samuel Purcell as the colliery's manager, a position he held until his death almost 25 years later.

In 1896, the mine was acquired by Lord Masham, who owned other collieries at Featherstone. Throughout the 1890s, the mine was subject to strike action on two counts; firstly, the amount that miners were paid for producing coal from the Silkstone Seam, which they believed, should be on a par with other collieries producing coal from the same seam. Secondly, Rhodes had introduced a type of fork for moving the coal from the face into the tubs known as riddles, which meant that smaller pieces of coal slipped through the tines and was less efficient as a shovel. As miners were paid by the amount they mined per shift, this led to another set of strike action.

In the 1950s, the colliery was providing employment for over 2,000 men. In 1986, a year after the miners strike, the pit was producing over 34,000 tonnes (37,000 tons) per week, which was above the average of 5 tonnes (5.5 tons) per person on one shift. Despite the breaking of production records, overtime was not available and 400 miners at PoW were threatening to go on strike.

In March 1979, Radio One DJs Simon Bates and John Peel, broadcast a programme live from the colliery, with the first song requested being, appropriately enough, Shaft. By 1981, the colliery working had been transformed from a deep mine, into a drift mine operation, and despite being in Pontefract, was listed as being in the NCBs North Yorkshire region.

A drawdown of the number of pits in the 1990s, led to a suggestion that Prince of Wales Colliery should be merged with nearby Kellingley Colliery, with the output being brought to the surface in just one location.

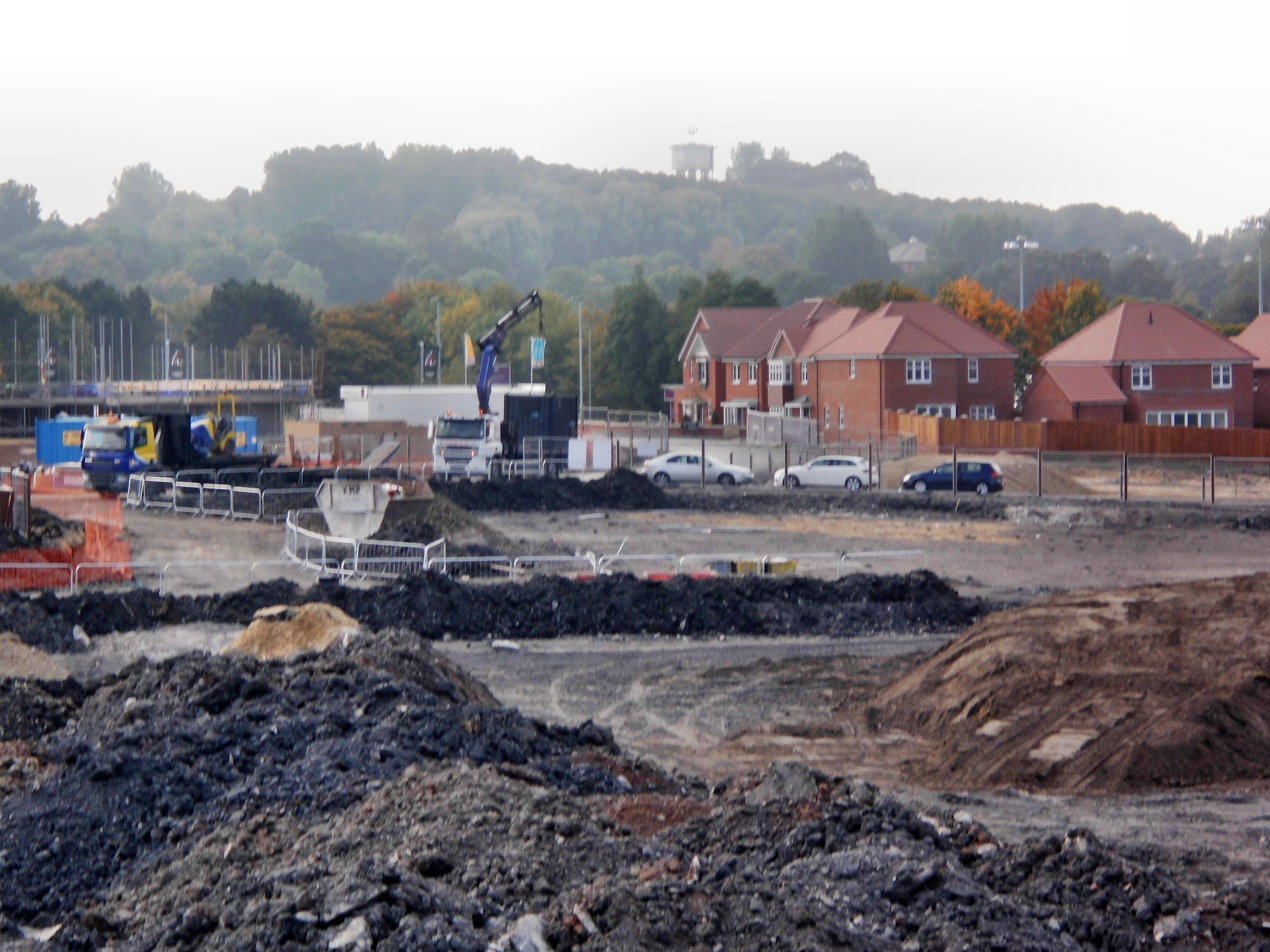
New houses being built on Prince of Wales site

In 2001, geological problems with the mine were discovered which led to an investigation paid for by the Department of Trade and Industry. This revealed that the cost of extracting the remaining 8,000,000 tonnes (8,800,000 tons) of coal was too expensive, and in January 2002, UK Coal announced the closure of the mine for later in the same year. The company had been trying to develop the Went Edge reserves, and the inability to do so, meant the writing off of some £15.8 million in its initial investment. After closure in August 2002, equipment recovery took two months.

In 2013, the site was remediated by Harworth Group and by 2018, almost 400 homes have been built on the 77-acre (31 ha) site with planning permission for up to 900 homes. The remediation yielded over 3,000,000 tonnes (3,300,000 tons) of coal, which was sent to power stations to generate electricity. There are plans to erect a steel memorial to the miners who worked at the colliery on the new housing estate built on the site.

In 2014, Alkane developed a methane plant at the site which burns the gas drawn from underground to turn it into energy. The site is rated at 2 megawatts.

== Incidents ==
- 9 August 1876, a 17-year old worker was killed by a descending access cage when he stepped underneath it. The 3-tonne (3.3-ton) cage killed the victim instantly, described as having "his head frightfully crushed."
- 2 April 1998, an explosion of firedamp caused the evacuation of 141 workers.

== Notable colliers ==
- Jimmy Savile - worked as a Bevin Boy in the colliery during the Second World War
