= Harworth Group =

British real estate company

Harworth Group plc
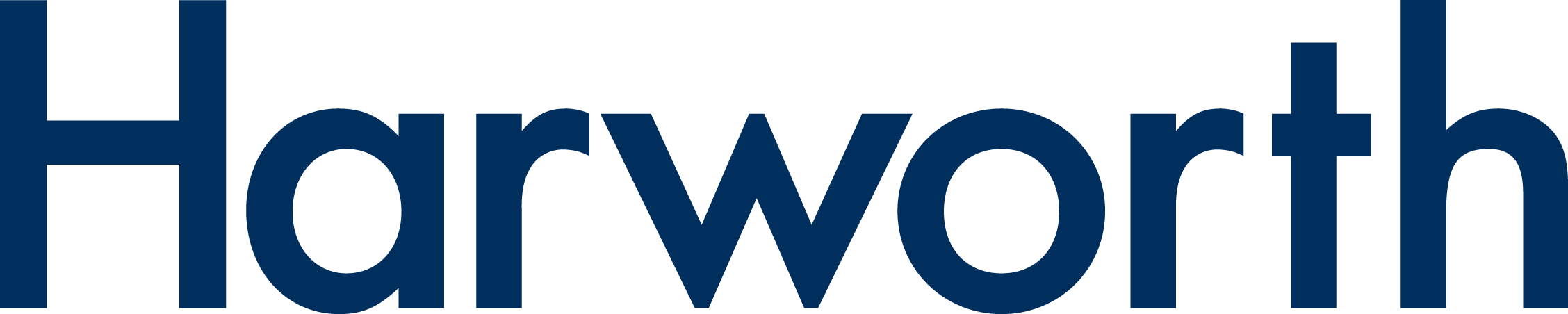
- Type: Public limited company
- Traded as: LSE: HWG
- Industry: Real Estate
- Headquarters: Rotherham, South Yorkshire, United Kingdom
- Key people: Alastair Lyons (Chairman); Lynda Shillaw (Chief Executive)
- Revenue: ▼£129.7 million (2025)
- Operating income: ▼£21.6 million (2025)
- Net income: ▼£9.5 million (2025)
- Parent: The Peel Group (since 2026)
- Website: harworthgroup.com

Harworth Group plc (commonly known as simply Harworth) is a property developer that specialises in regenerating brownfield sites in Yorkshire, the Midlands, and North West England. The company is headquartered in Rotherham in South Yorkshire. It was listed on the London Stock Exchange and was a member of the FTSE 250 Index until it became part of the Peel Group in October 2026.

== History ==
Harworth Estates was established in 2004 as the property division of UK Coal, named after the location of its headquarters in the village of Harworth in Nottinghamshire.

Following a restructuring in December 2012, UK Coal became Coalfield Resources plc. The new company owned 24.9% of Harworth Estates, with the remaining 75.1% owned by UK Coal's pension trustees, and later transferred to the Pension Protection Fund.

In March 2015, Coalfield Resources bought the remaining 75.1% of Harworth Estates from the Pension Protection Fund for £150 million. The acquisition was financed through a mixture of issuing new shares to the Pension Protection Fund and raising money though a public offering. It was renamed Harworth Group plc and was listed on the London Stock Exchange.

In March 2018, Alastair Lyons joined the business as Chairman. In November 2020, Lynda Shillaw was appointed Chief Executive.

As of 2023, the Pension Protection Fund retained a 23% holding in the business. The Peel Group owned a further 14% through its subsidiary, Goodweather Investment Management.

In September 2026, the Peel Group secured over 50% of the company's shares at a cost of £630 million. Then, in October 2026, the Peel Group increased its holding to 75% of the companies shares, allowing it to request delisting of the company from the London Stock Exchange.

== Operations ==
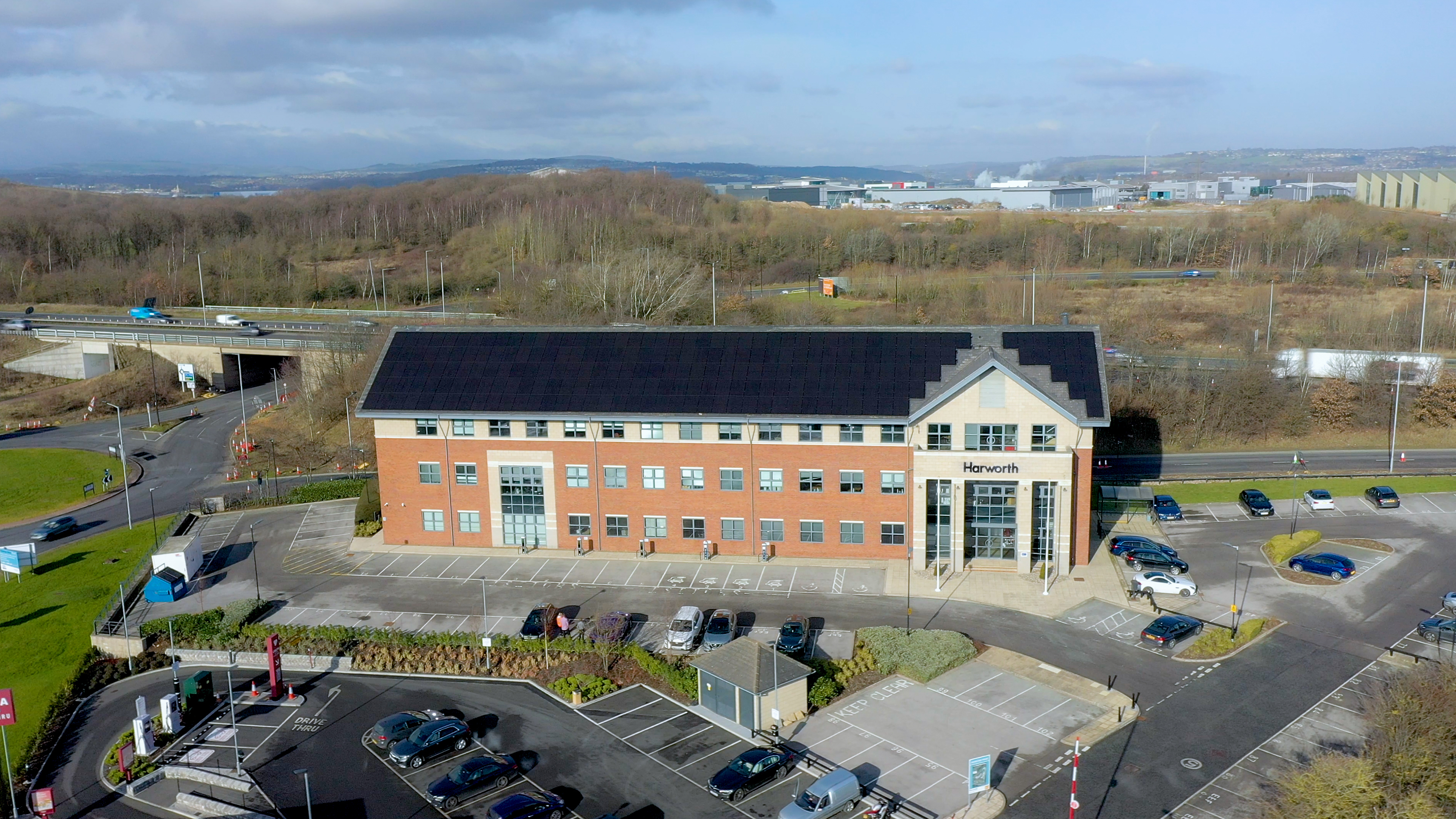
Harworth's head office in Rotherham, South Yorkshire

Harworth owns approximately 14,000 acres (5,700 ha) of land across 100 sites, much of which is on the sites of old coal mines in the north of England and the Midlands. The business remediates land, takes it through the planning system, adds infrastructure and then either sells land to housebuilders or constructs industrial units.

In 2018 Harworth established a regional operating model, creating three regional teams: Yorkshire & Central, Midlands and North West.

== Major sites ==
Harworth is the owner or developer of a number of sites:

- Advanced Manufacturing Park in Rotherham, South Yorkshire
- Bennerley Ironworks' former site, adjacent to Bennerley Viaduct
- Ironbridge power station in Ironbridge, Shropshire
- Pheasant Hill Park in South Yorkshire, site of the former Rossington Colliery
- Prince of Wales Colliery in Pontefract, West Yorkshire
- Skelton Grange power station in Leeds, West Yorkshire
- Simpson Park, Nottinghamshire, site of the former Harworth Colliery
- Stewartby Brickworks, Bedfordshire
- Thoresby Vale, Nottinghamshire, site of the former Thoresby Colliery, where there are plans for the development of 800 homes
- Waverley, South Yorkshire in Rotherham, South Yorkshire, site of the former Orgreave Colliery
