= Bircotes =

Coordinates: 53.418°N 1.051°W

- Town
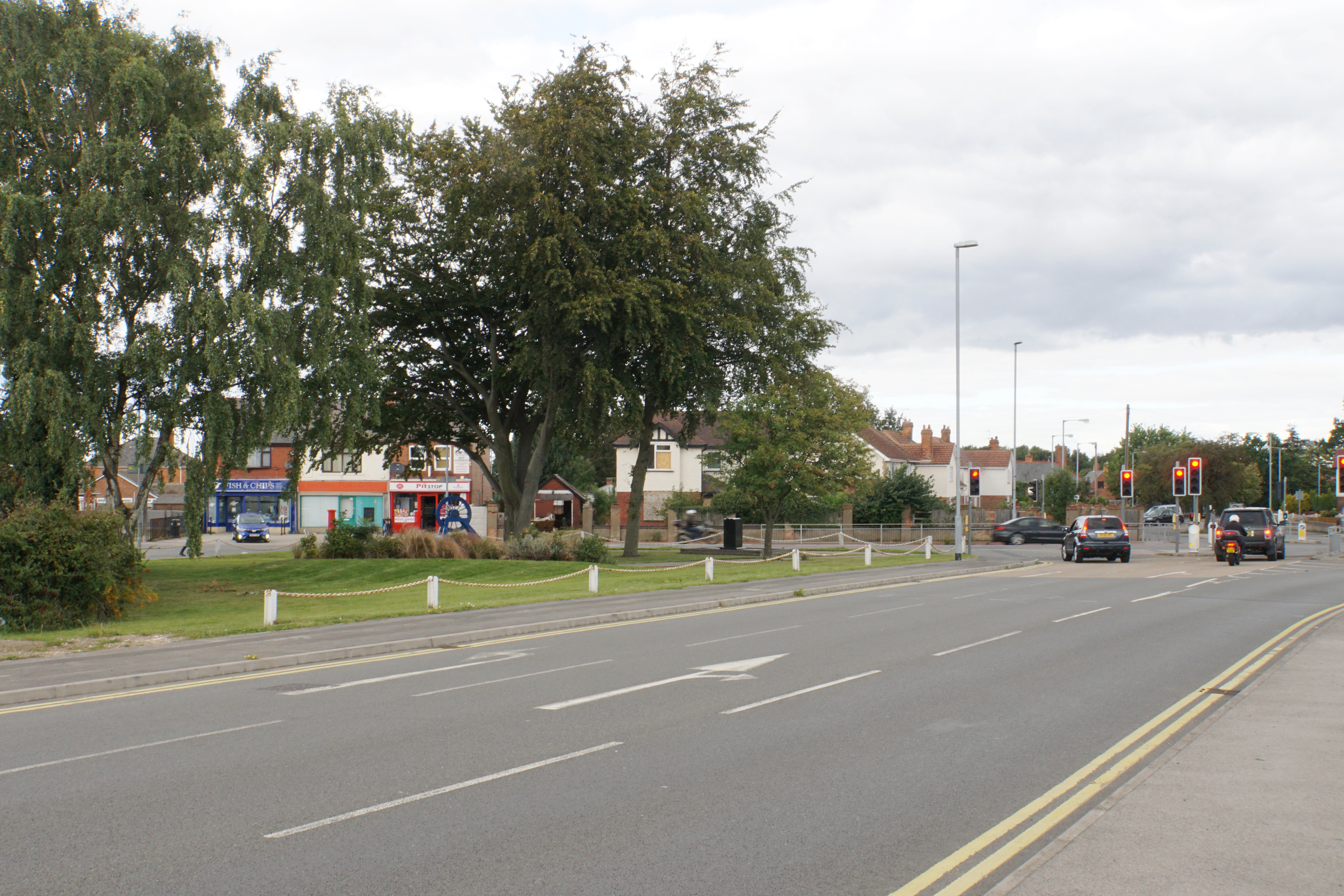
- Main Gate Drive

- Location within Nottinghamshire
- Civil parish: Harworth Bircotes
- District: Bassetlaw
- Shire county: Nottinghamshire
- Region: East Midlands
- Country: England
- Sovereign state: United Kingdom
- Post town: Doncaster
- Postcode district: DN11
- Dialling code: 01302
- Police: Nottinghamshire
- Fire: Nottinghamshire
- Ambulance: East Midlands
- UK Parliament: Bassetlaw
- Website: https://harworthandbircotestowncouncil.org.uk/

Bircotes with Harworth are a town in the civil parish of Harworth and Bircotes in the Bassetlaw district of Nottinghamshire, England on the border with South Yorkshire. The population of the civil parish was 7,948. The local school in the area is Serlby Park Academy.

== History and Industrial Revolution ==
Bircotes was founded in the 1920s, with the discovery of coal during the First World War and the establishment of Harworth Colliery (which has since closed), to provide homes for miners. It was home to one of the last deep-mine pits in the UK.

== See also ==
- Listed buildings in Harworth Bircotes
- RAF Bircotes
