= Skelton Grange power station =

Skelton Grange Power Stations
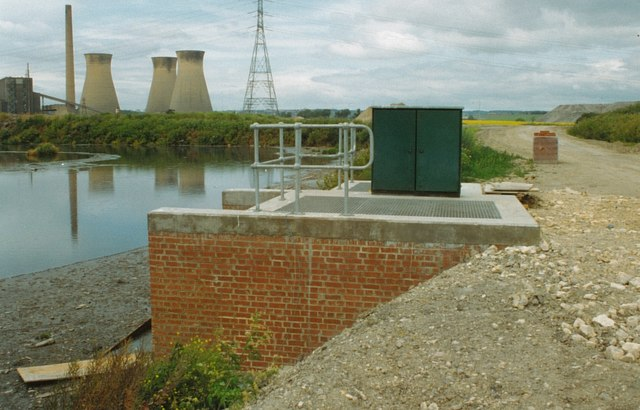
- Country: England
- Location: Stourton, Leeds
- Coordinates: 53°46′32″N 01°29′31″W
- Status: Decommissioned and demolished
- Construction began: A: 1946; B: 1958
- Commission date: A: 1951; B: 1960–62
- Decommission date: A: 1983; B: 1994
- Owners: British Electricity Authority (1951–1955); Central Electricity Authority (1955–1957); Central Electricity Generating Board (1958–1990); National Power (1990–1995)
- Operator: As owner

Thermal power station
- Primary fuel: Coal
- Site area: 130 acres
- Chimneys: A: 2 B: 1
- Cooling towers: A: 3 B: 4
- Cooling source: River water and cooling towers

Power generation
- Units operational: A: 360 MW total B: 4 ×120 MW
- Units decommissioned: All

Skelton Grange Power Station refers to two now-demolished coal fired power stations (Skelton Grange 'A' and Skelton Grange 'B') that served the city of Leeds and surrounding areas. They were located in the Stourton area of the city. The power stations were built in the early 1950s and early 1960s, taken out of use in 1983 and 1994 and subsequently dismantled but the associated 275 kV switching substation was retained and remains in use.

== Skelton Grange A ==
Preparatory work for Skelton Grange was begun by Leeds Corporation in 1946. Upon nationalisation of the British electricity supply industry in 1948 the partly built plant was vested in the British Electricity Authority (1948–55), then the Central Electricity Authority (1955–57) and the Central Electricity Generating Board (CEGB) from 1958. The power station was designed and built by Marples Ridgway, a joint venture between Lord Marples and Reginald Ridgway. The site was selected for accessibility to the Aire and Calder Navigation, this provided access for colliers delivering coal and removing ash, and water for cooling.

Skelton Grange A had a generating capacity of 360 MW. There were six C. A. Parsons 60 MW 3-cylinder reaction type turbines with 75,000 kVA alternators generating at 11 kV. The first generating set was commissioned in April 1951 followed by the second set in November 1951, then August 1952, June 1954, December 1954 and the sixth set in December 1955. The boiler plant comprised nine International Combustion 6 × 360,000 lb/hr and 3 × 550,000 lb/hr (a total of 480 kg/s) operating at 975 psi and 940 °F (67.2 bar and 504 °C). The station had two chimneys and originally had three cooling towers. The Kier cooling towers each had a capacity of 3.25 million gallons per hour 4.1 m^{3}/s). Water was supplied from the River Aire and sewage effluent.

The capacity and output of Skelton Grange A is given in the following table.

Skelton Grange A electricity capacity and output
Year	1954	1955	1956	1957	1958	1961	1962	1963	1967	1971	1979	1982
Installed capacity, MW	168	280	336	336	336	360	360	360	360	360	180	180
Electricity output, GWh	1,331.8	1,496.5	2,093.9	2,329.6	2,677.9	2317	2038	1768	1794	1,333.8	502	298.1

In October 1975 the Central Electricity Generating Board (CEGB) gave the station 12 months notice of partial closure. Full closure of the A station was on 31 October 1983.

== Skelton Grange B ==
Skelton Grange B was built to the south east of the A station, and was commissioned by the CEGB in 1960–62. The station was originally planned for 6 × 60 MW sets but in late 1956 it was amended to utilise the newer more efficient 120 MW sets. Unit No. 1 of the B station was first commissioned in October 1960, Units 2 and 3 were commissioned in 1961 and Unit 4 in 1962. The B station had four pulverised fuel boilers each producing 108 kg/s of steam. The steam conditions were 103.42 bar at 538 °C, reheat was to 538 °C. There were four 120 MW turbo-alternators giving a total gross installed capacity of 480 MW, and a net output of 448 MW. Skelton Grange B was one of the CEGB's twenty steam power stations with the highest thermal efficiency; in 1963–4 the thermal efficiency was 32.24 per cent, 32.02 per cent in 1964–5, and 31.90 per cent in 1965–6. The annual electricity output of Skelton Grange B was:

Electricity output of Skelton Grange B
Year	1960–1	1961–2	1962–3	1963–4	1964–5	1965–6	1966–7	1971–2	1978–9	1981–2
Installed capacity, MW	120	480	480	448	448	448	480	480	480	480
Electricity supplied, GWh	222	1308	2500	2,339	2,427	2,376	2,528	1,772	1,422	1,790

Condensing of steam was by regenerative condensers using circulating water from the River Aire and originally four cooling towers. Skelton Grange B had a single taller chimney. Upon privatisation of the electricity industry in 1990 ownership of the B station was transferred to National Power. Skelton Grange B station closed in 1994. The cooling towers and chimneys were demolished on 12 November 1995.

== Development proposals ==
The site has had many proposals for re-use since it closed; it was considered as a site for a new stadium for Leeds United in 2001, and RWE npower wanted to construct industrial warehousing on the site in 2007. It was sold to the Harworth Group in 2016, who have used some of the land for their Gateway 45 project. The site was also considered as a location for a depot for High Speed 2 rolling stock terminating and starting at Leeds.

In June 2024 it was announced that Microsoft had bought a 48-acre piece of land at the site from Harworth Group, for the development of a data centre.

== See also ==
- Kirkstall Power Station
