= Maltby Main Colliery =

Former coal mine in South Yorkshire, England

Coordinates: 53.426°N 1.172°W

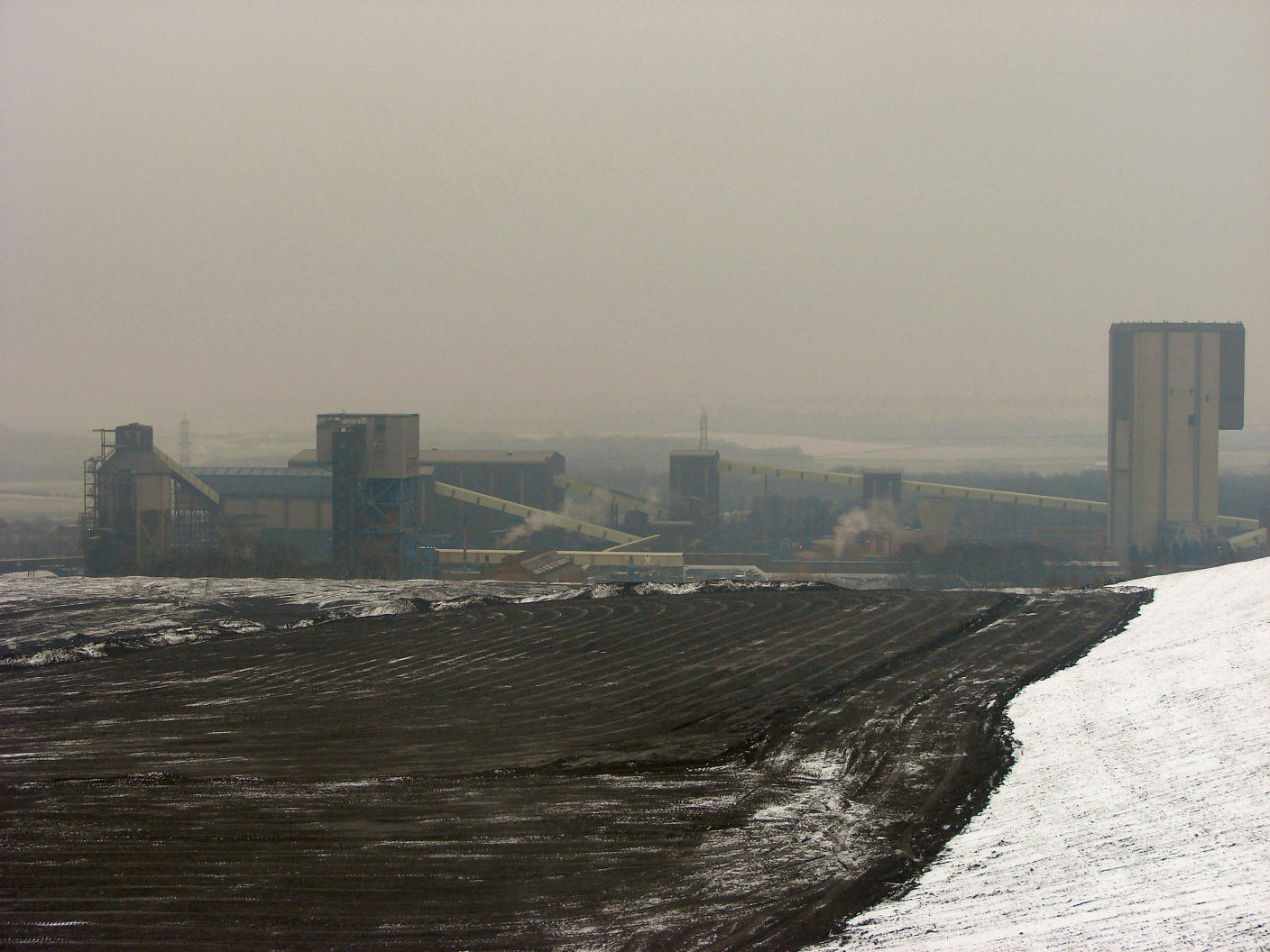
Maltby Main Colliery in 2007

The Maltby Main Colliery was a coal mine located 7 miles (11 km) east of Rotherham on the eastern edge of Maltby, South Yorkshire, England. The mine was closed in 2013.

== History ==
The first shafts at Maltby Main Colliery were sunk in 1910, and the first coal produced in 1912, though not all faces were in production until 1914. Situated in a wooded area on Tickhill Road the colliery was some distance from the township of Maltby and in order to gain a workforce the colliery company commissioned the building of Maltby Model Village, an estate of 400 houses. The colliery was opened by the Maltby Main Colliery Company, a subsidiary of the Sheepbridge Iron and Coal Company. Before nationalisation the owners were given as Amalgamated Denaby Collieries Ltd.

An explosion in the pit occurred 28 July 1923, resulting in 27 deaths. A single unidentified body was recovered from the pit and buried in the local graveyard as The Unknown Miner.

The two shafts were deepened in the ten years from 1951 and this allowed horizontal access to the Barnsley seam. This also gave access to a new Swallow Wood seam. By 1969 the Barnsley seam was considered exhausted and production went over to Swallow Wood. In 1981 a major project commenced to mine the Parkgate seam. Costing £18 million the first coal was brought to the surface just one year later.

The colliery was mass picketed during the 1984–1985 miners' strike during attempts by contractors to carry out building work at the pit.

The colliery was bought by RJB Mining, later renamed UK Coal, in 1994. Silverwood Colliery, the adjacent mine, closed in 1994 but had good reserves which could be worked from Maltby. Uncertainties with contracts, notably with the electricity generators, production was stopped in 1997. The pit recommenced operations and coal was gained from both the Parkgate seam, which is estimated to be exhausted by 2014, and the Silkstone seam, which will extend the life of the pit beyond that date.

In 2007 Maltby Colliery was sold by UK Coal to Hargreaves Services plc for £21.5 million, resulting in the continued employment of 500 people.

By the end of 1989, access to the reserves was gained by two shafts; No.2, 3,228 feet (984 m) deep and No.3, 3,251 feet (991 m) deep, with the capability of winding up to 1,500 tonnes of mineral an hour to the surface.

In May 2012 unusual and dangerous geological conditions (oil, water and gas ingress) were discovered in workings of the T125 block that was to be exploited in 2013, resulting in abandonment of the tailgate for that block (see Longwall mining), and was expected to cause a gap in production of 1.5 to 3 months. In late 2012 the 540 employees were given redundancies notices, and the pit owner announced it was to mothball the colliery due to dangerous underground conditions. In December 2012 Hargeaves announced that the colliery was to close due to the geological problems.

The mine was closed in 2013, and the above ground structures demolished in 2014.

== See also ==
- List of Yorkshire Pits
- South Yorkshire Joint Railway, rail connection for the colliery
