= Serco =

British company

Serco Group plc
- Formerly: R.C.A Limited (1929–1987); Dealmove PLC (1986–1987)
- Type: Public limited company
- Traded as: LSE: SRP; FTSE 250 component
- Industry: Government Services, Shipbuilding, and Defence
- Founded: 10 September 1929; 97 years ago
- Headquarters: Hook, Hart, England, UK
- Area served: Worldwide
- Key people: John Rishton (chairman); Anthony Kirby (CEO)
- Revenue: ▲£4,876.8 million (2025)
- Operating income: ▼£271.6 million (2025)
- Net income: ▲£145.6 million (2025)
- Number of employees: 50,000 (2026)
- Subsidiaries: List: Serco Marine Services; DMS Maritime
- Website: serco.com

Serco Group plc is a British multinational defence, health, space, justice, migration, customer services, and transport company. It is headquartered in Hook, Hampshire, England. The company operates in continental Europe, the Middle East, the Asia Pacific region, including Australia and Hong Kong, and North America. It is listed on the London Stock Exchange and is a constituent of the FTSE 250 Index.

The company was founded as RCA Services Limited in 1929, a UK-based division of the Radio Corporation of America. The company began providing technical and engineering services to the British War Office during the Second World War. During the Cold War era, it specialised in the provision of defense systems engineering and facilities management services, including the maintenance of sonar, early warning radar and satellite systems. Following a management buyout, the firm changed to the name Serco ('Services Company') in 1987 and was listed on the London Stock Exchange one year later. The company was restructured during the 1980s, reorientated itself towards services beyond engineering, and expanded its presence globally.

Serco has encountered controversy, described by legal services firm Appleby as a "history of problems, failures, fatal errors and overcharging". During 2013, then-chairman Alastair Lyons resigned from the company after it was found that it had overcharged the UK Government for electronically monitoring criminals. Serco underwent a corporate renewal programme during the 2010s, created in collaboration with the United Kingdom government, which overhauled the management of contracts and commercial auditing.

== History ==
=== RCA Services ===
Serco was founded in 1929 as RCA Services Limited, a British-based division of the Radio Corporation of America, and initially provided technical services to the cinema industry.

RCA Services Limited began providing services to government departments during the Second World War. After the onset of the conflict, the company was contracted by the British War Office due to the company's engineering and technical background to supply the department with equipment which would simulate the sound of warfare to confuse the enemy. During 1952, RCA Services was contracted to produce submarine-detecting sonar equipment for the United States Navy. In 1960, it was awarded the contract to design, install, and maintain the UK Ministry of Defence (MoD) Ballistic Missile Early Warning System, including ongoing facility management such as cleaning, transport, and logistical stores.

In the 1980s, the European Space Agency contracted RCA Services to support and maintain computer systems and satellites.

=== Reinvention as a management company ===
By the 1980s, RCA Services began to interpret their company product as the management, rather than being just an engineering and science company. For their MoD Radar contract at RAF Fylingdales, "the art, it turned out, was in running the people, not the radar." During 1984, RCA Services was awarded the Ministry of Defence's first outsourcing contract, under which it managed warehousing using the knowledge of staff who had completed similar work at RAF Fylingdales.

Following the takeover of RCA by General Electric in late 1985, RCA Services Limited was bought out by its local management. During 1987, the firm changed its name to Serco ('Services Company') and became a London Stock Exchange listed company one year later. By 1990s, Serco had expanded from the United Kingdom and Europe, developing a global presence with major activities in Hong Kong, Australia, New Zealand, and North America.

During December 2008, Serco acquired SI International, a provider of IT services to the United States government in exchange for $524 million.

=== Controversies and restructuring ===
During 2013, both Serco and its competitor G4S were found to have maintained inaccurate records and overcharged the UK Government for electronically monitoring criminals. In November 2014, its share price, which stood at 674p before the taxpayer scandal broke in 2013, collapsed to 218.7p, after four profit warnings. That same month, it was announced that Alastair Lyons, the chairman of Serco, was resigning from his position. Speaking at the time, Lyons referred to "operational mis-steps" for which he took "ultimate responsibility", but said he had not been forced out.

In 2014, Serco incurred a loss of £991 million, which was followed by a smaller loss of £69.4 million in 2015. In response, Rupert Soames, Lyons's successor as chief executive, sold off "scores of divisions". Soames stated that Serco was suffering from ministers' improved ability at driving a bargain, and claimed that "the Government has got much more adept at writing contracts and transferring risk to the private sector". Following an eight-year long investigation and trial, Serco's executives at the time were cleared of fraud charges in April 2021.

=== Corporate renewal ===
Following the events of 2013, Serco underwent a corporate renewal programme designed by the company and the United Kingdom government which overhauled the company's contract management and auditing processes. By 2019, Cabinet Office publicised that "the remedial actions taken in 2013-14 were sufficient with regard to this incidence of wrongdoing".

During September 2017, Serco announced that it was in the process of combining its UK and Europe operations.

John Rishton was appointed as non-executive chairman in spring 2021, succeeding Sir Roy Gardner, who held the position from May 2015. Rishton had been on the board since September 2016.

In August 2022, Serco announced that it would distribute £9 million in one-off payments to about 45,000 non-management staff as the firm lifted its profit guidance and dividend; this amount equated to around £200 for each of its 45,000 workers.

In December 2023, Serco acquired European Homecare, a specialist provider of immigration services to public sector customers in Germany, for €40 million (£34 million).

== UK operations ==
=== Defence ===
By 2004, Serco held numerous defence contracts, including the UK Government's contract for the maintenance of the Ballistic Missile Early Warning System at RAF Fylingdales. The MoD extended Serco's contract in October 2022 for a further three years, under which the company provides maintenance, repair, and operational services for the radar in Yorkshire, England. Serco has contracts for the operation and maintenance of RAF Brize Norton, RAF Halton, RAF Northolt and RNAS Culdrose in the UK and RAF Ascension Island in the mid-Atlantic.

Serco provides support services to garrisons in Australia. Serco manages many aspects of operations at the Defence Academy of the United Kingdom in Shrivenham. Prior to June 2021, Serco was one of three partners in the consortium who managed the Atomic Weapons Establishment until it was taken over by the MoD: in July 2015, the Office for Nuclear Regulation issued an improvement notice to the consortium demanding that it demonstrate that it has a long-term strategy for managing higher active radioactive waste in order to reduce the risk to the public and its employees.

Serco is a major subcontractor to Airbus Defence and Space on the Skynet military communications satellites under a private finance initiative (PFI) contract.

Serco Marine Services is responsible for fleet support at the three main UK naval bases, HMNB Portsmouth, HMNB Devonport and HMNB Clyde. In November 2022, the MoD awarded Serco a £200 million follow-on contract, lasting 27 months, to provide marine services for the Royal Navy.

=== Transport ===
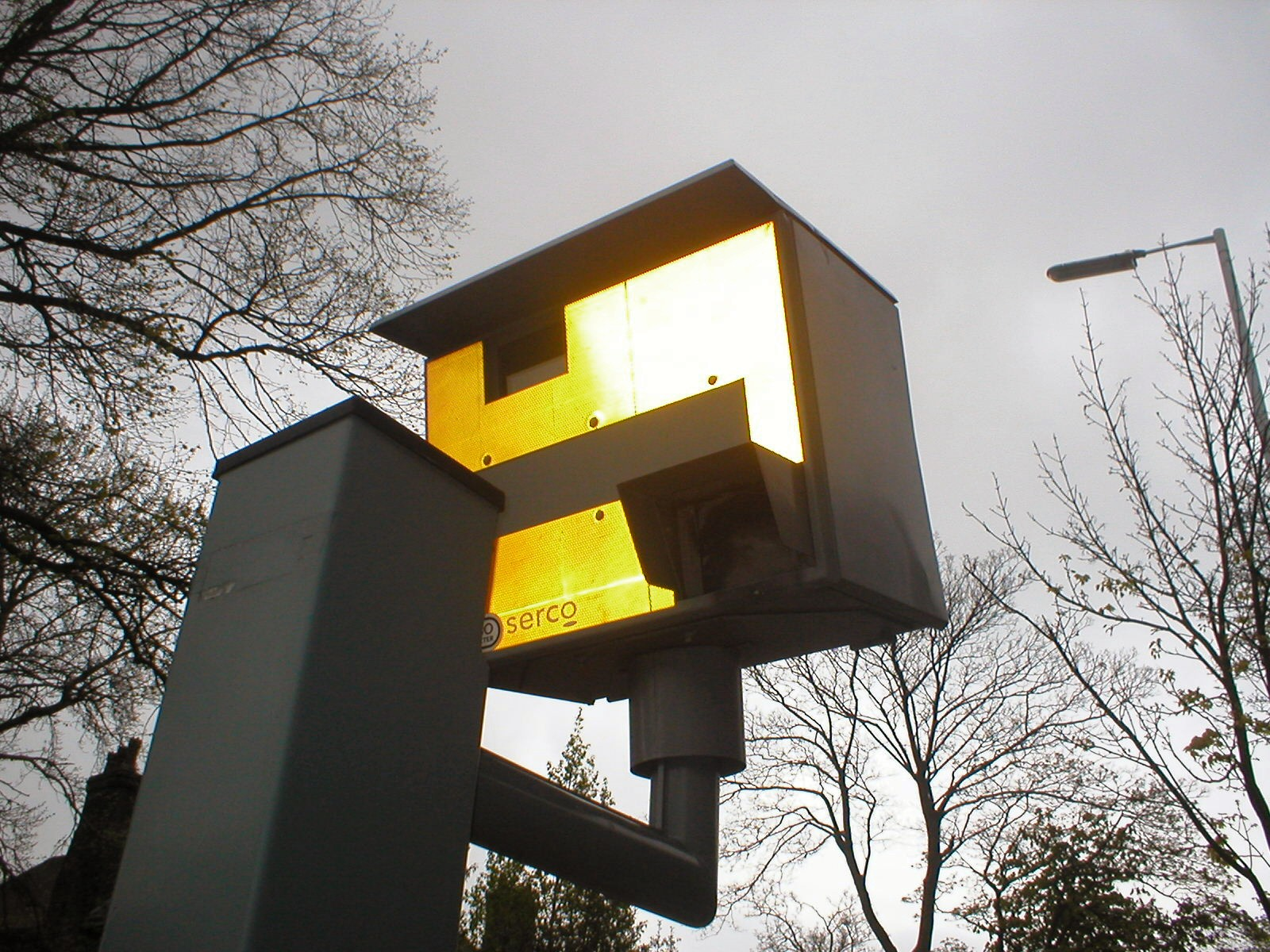
A Gatso Serco speed camera

In London, Serco has operated the London Cycle Hire Scheme for Transport for London since it was first introduced in 2010. During December 2022, Serco signed a three-year contract extension valued at £50 million to continue maintaining and distributing the bikes, including the newly introduced e-Bikes.

Serco has operated a number of train operating companies. It has a 50% shareholding in Serco-Abellio that has a concession to operate the Merseyrail franchise in Merseyside until 2028, and previously operated the Northern Rail franchise from December 2004 until March 2016. Between April 2015 and June 2023, Serco operated the Caledonian Sleeper between London and Scotland; the contract was terminated early after Serco's request to rebase the loss making contract was deemed by Transport Scotland to not offer value.

In 1997, Serco purchased the Railtest business as part of the privatisation of British Rail. Included in the sale was a management contract for the Old Dalby Test Track. Between 1997 and 2004, Serco operated the National Rail Enquiry Service under contract to the Association of Train Operating Companies. It maintains Network Rail's fleet of infrastructure and maintenance trains at the Railway Technical Centre.

In Scotland, Serco has operated the NorthLink Ferries ferry service since July 2012. In September 2018, the firm commenced operating a bicycle-sharing system under contract to Transport for Edinburgh; these scheme was closed during September 2021.

Serco's Home Affairs division operates speed camera systems throughout the UK and, until November 2013, designed, wrote and tested the software that controls the matrix message signs, signals, emergency roadside telephones (SOS) and traffic monitoring on England's motorway network including, until 2011, the National Traffic Control Centre.

Starting in 1997, Serco operated the London's Docklands Light Railway (DLR) under franchise. In November 2005, TfL announced that Serco had retained the DLR franchise for seven years from May 2006; this contract was extended until September 2014 in January 2013. However, in July 2014, the DLR franchise was awarded to KeolisAmey, thus Serco handed over operations on 7 December 2014.

Serco operated Scatsta Airport in Shetland until its closure in 2020. During June 2010, Serco signed a £4 million contract to operate all air traffic control services for Coventry Airport.

=== Border security ===
Serco was part of a consortium called Trusted Borders, led by Raytheon Systems Limited, to put in place e-Borders under a contract awarded by the UK Home Office in 2007. As a subcontractor to Raytheon, Serco was responsible for delivering the infrastructure and service management of e-Borders; Raytheon had its contract terminated in July 2010 and Serco at the time stated it had fulfilled all its commitments on the contract.

=== Work and pensions ===
Serco was contracted to the Department for Work and Pensions (DWP) to provide telephone advice on behalf of DWP to recipients of Support for Mortgage Interest (SMI), which ended in April 2018.

=== Science ===
Prior to 2015, Serco managed the UK's National Physical Laboratory. It currently provides IT Services, Industrial Support and Cryogenic Operations Support and Maintenance at CERN. Serco was part of a consortium that ran the UK's National Nuclear Laboratory under contract up until October 2013.

=== Prisons and justice ===
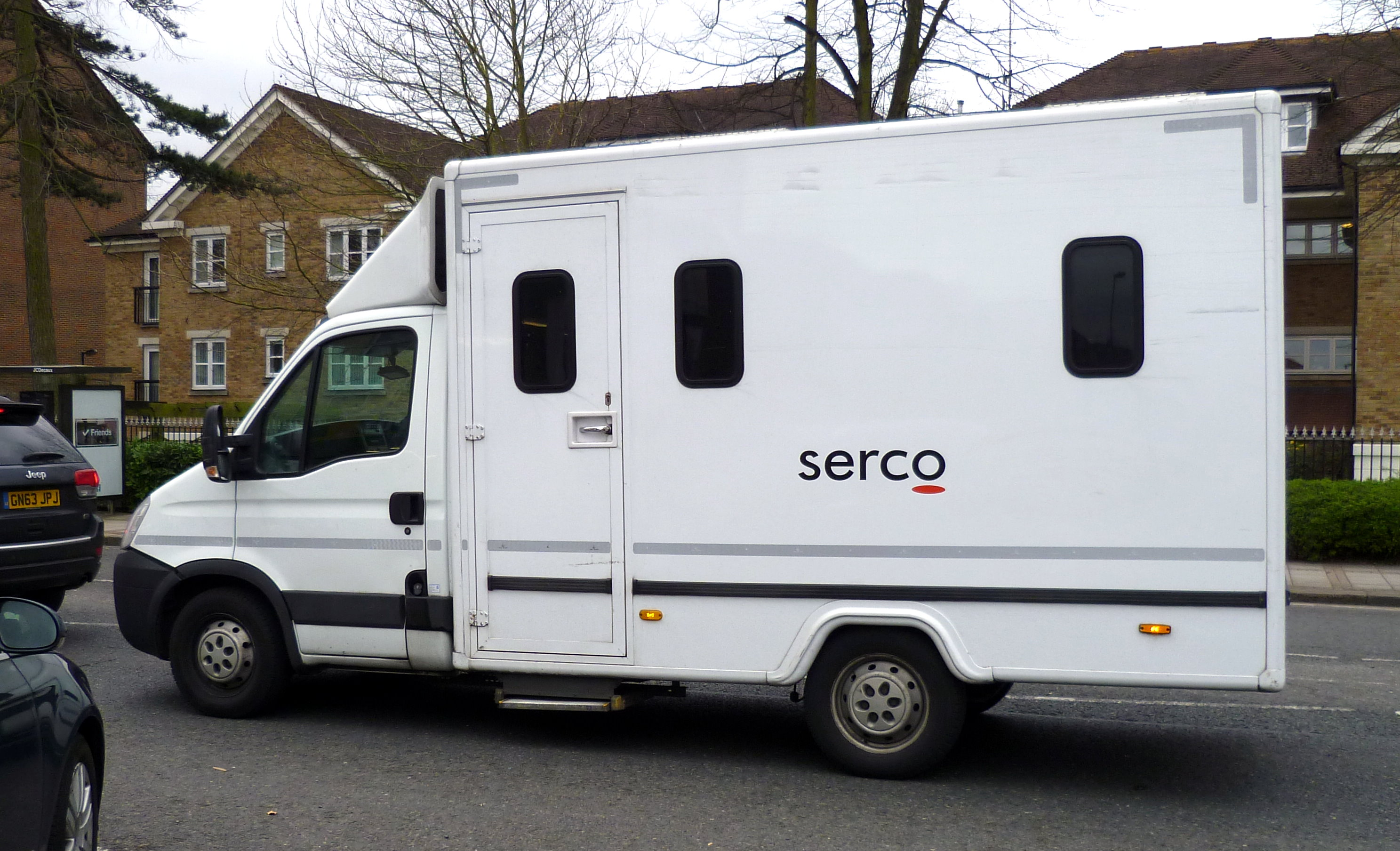
A Serco van

In Britain, Serco supplies electronic tagging devices for offenders and asylum seekers. Serco, as well as its rival G4S, was accused of overcharging the Ministry of Justice on its contract to tag offenders. The firm issued a profit warning for 2014 as a result of the costs of becoming embroiled in an electronic tagging scandal. Serco repaid £68.5 million to the government for its overcharging on the contract. In May 2014, a Survation poll for the campaign group We Own It, found that 63% of respondents thought Serco should be banned from bidding for any new public contracts after the firm was investigated for overcharging on government contracts.

Serco runs four prisons, a young offenders institution and a secure training centre. It has operated two immigration removal centres since 2007. Serco is responsible for the contracted-out court escort services in the south-east area, formerly a role undertaken by HM Prison Service.

In September 2013, Serco was accused of an extensive cover-up over sexual abuse at Yarl's Wood Immigration Removal Centre in Bedfordshire, England. During August 2014, it was criticised for using immigrant detainees as cheap labour, with some being paid as little as £1 per hour. The decision to award Serco a new £70 million eight-year contract to run Yarl's Wood has been criticised; Natasha Walter, of Women for Refugee Women, said "Serco is clearly unfit to manage a centre where vulnerable women are held and it is unacceptable the government continues to entrust Serco with the safety of women who are survivors of sexual violence."

During 2019, a fine of £19.2 million was imposed on Serco following delayed legal action started in 2013 for fraud and false accounting over its electronic tagging service for the Ministry of Justice. Serco was also ordered to pay the full amount of the Serious Fraud Office's investigative costs of £3.7 million. In his judgment, Mr Justice Davis said: "SGL (Serco Geografix Ltd) engaged in quite deliberate fraud against the Ministry of Justice in relation to the provision of services vital to the criminal justice system." During April 2021, the charged ex-directors of firm's subsidiary were cleared of fraud and false accounting, primarily due to the SFO having failed to disclose certain documents to the defense, resulting in issues that, according to the judge, "undermine the process of disclosure to the extent that the trial cannot safely and fairly proceed until they have been remedied".

In July 2022, the company supplied food containing maggots to children in a hotel in the Midlands. Serco issued an apology and said it would visit the hotel.

In October 2024, Serco's tracking devices and panic alarms on prison vans were disabled after a cyber attack. Allegedly, some Serco prisoner custody officers were unaware that vehicles were still being used to transport prisoners for three days after the attack despite continuing software faults.

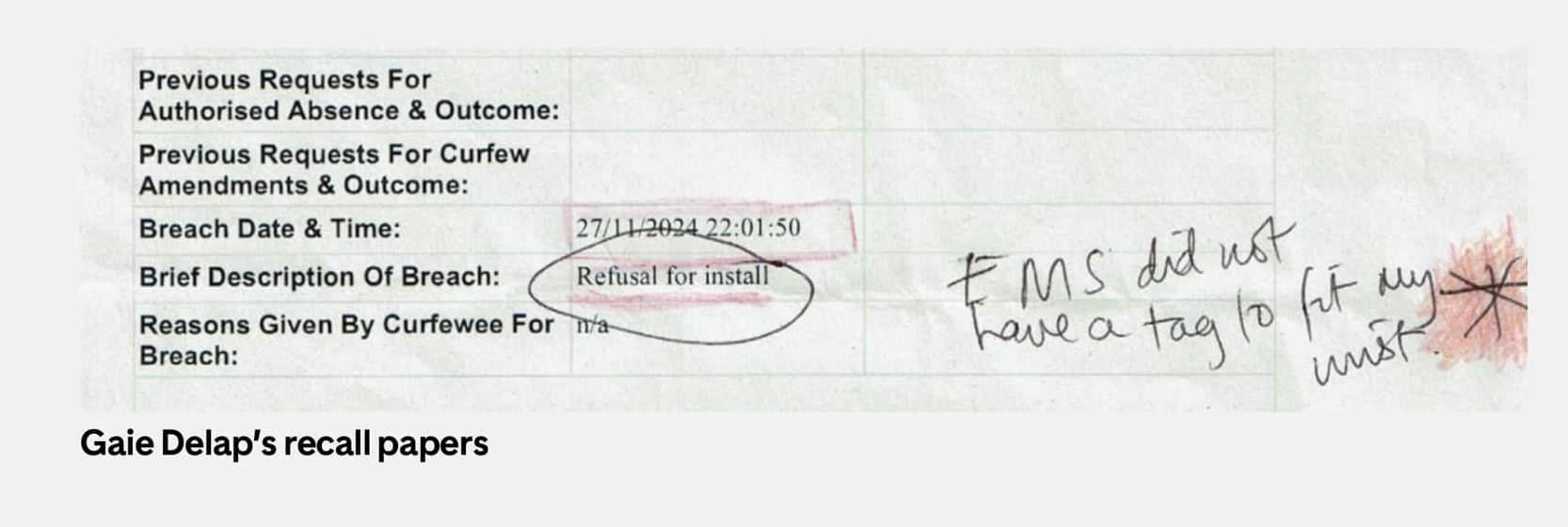
Recall to prison paperwork. The handwriting is Gaie Delap's own.

In December 2024, Serco was accused of failing to tag 77 year old climate protestor Gaie Delap after her release on licence from HMP Peterborough, resulting in her being recalled to custody. Her supporters argued that Serco had failed to supply a tag small enough for her average-sized wrist since she could not be tagged on her ankle for medical reasons. They also accused Serco of misrepresenting the reason for its failure to tag Delap, after falsely claiming she had refused to cooperate with its fitting. In January 2025, Delap discovered that she would have to serve a further 20 days in prison, the amount of time Serco had previously spent unsuccessfully trying to find a suitable bracelet.

=== Housing ===
During August 2018, it was disclosed that Serco had been planning to evict asylum seekers in Glasgow before their appeal procedure was completed; the legality of such actions under Scottish law was questioned by lawyers. Serco confirmed that it was serving a notice of eviction on many tenants, causing alarm and lawyers challenged one asylum seeker's eviction at the Scottish Court of Session. Councillor Jennifer Layden, equalities and human rights convener for Glasgow, said, "The lock change announcement by the Home Office and Serco has caused widespread fear and alarm among asylum seekers in Glasgow. There is confusion and panic among the community – some of whom have limited English and who may not be affected by Serco's announcement. Both Serco and the Home Office have a responsibility to put this vulnerable group at ease". Two asylum seekers started a hunger strike.

In January 2019, it was reported that Serco had lost the contract to provide housing to asylum seekers in Glasgow. That same year, a Freedom of Information request by the Scottish Refugee Council showed that Serco had been charged nearly £3 million by the Home Office for repeatedly breaching its contract to house asylum seekers in Glasgow and Northern Ireland.

In 2026, a cleaner working for Serco was charged with misconduct in public office after releasing the addresses where asylum seekers were residing in Thetford, which preceded several days of mob violence in the town.

=== Health ===
Serco provide facilities management services at the Norfolk and Norwich University Hospital, Leicester Royal Infirmary, and Wishaw General Hospital.

The company held the contract for out-of-hours GP services in Cornwall, from which it withdrew in December 2013 after the company left the county short of doctors. Serco also stated that it would stop running Braintree hospital in Essex as it opted to pull out of managing GP services and large hospitals.

In health services, Serco's failures include the poor handling of pathology labs and fatal errors in patient records. At St Thomas' Hospital, the increase in the number of clinical incidents arising from Serco non-clinical management has resulted in patients receiving incorrect and infected blood, as well as patients suffering kidney damage due to Serco providing incorrect data used for medical calculations. A Serco employee later revealed that the company had falsified 252 reports to the National Health Service regarding Serco health services in Cornwall.

During November 2013, it emerged that Serco, which been awarded a contract for Suffolk Community Healthcare in 2012, had 72 job vacancies after previously cutting 137 positions. Problems identified by Ipswich and East Suffolk Clinical Commissioning Group include "staff capacity, skill mix, workload, succession planning and morale, training, communication, mobile working, care co-ordination centre processes, incidents and near miss incidents".

In April 2014, Serco revealed that it would lose almost £18 million on three of its NHS contracts. It had made provisions for losses in its Braintree and Cornwall contracts, which were cancelled early, and had also made provisions for losses in its contract for services in Suffolk. Serco claimed it would take longer to deliver the operational efficiencies it hoped for, despite stating in May 2013 that it expected to make a profit on the three-year, £140 million contract for community services. It said that staff had not recorded activity accurately on the electronic health record and that activity had increased significantly during the course of the contract.

In August 2014, the company had reportedly decided to withdraw from the clinical health services market in the UK after a review of the cost of delivering "improved service levels" and meeting the performance requirements of several existing contracts.

During October 2017, it was reported that Serco was preparing to buy healthcare contracts from facilities management business Carillion. This deal included 15 contracts, with annual revenues of approximately £90 million, for which Serco would pay £47.7 million, with Carillion losing £1 billion from the value of its order book.

In May 2020, Serco accidentally shared the personal email addresses of nearly 300 trainee COVID-19 contact tracers.

=== Education ===
Between 2001 and 2011, Serco held a ten-year contract with Bradford City Council to manage and operate the local education authority, providing education support services to the city's schools. According to senior council officials, this period was marked with "real problems" and management was taken back in house by the local authority after the contract's end-date. Serco has operated similar management arrangements for both Walsall and Stoke-on-Trent local education authorities. By 2009, Serco was one of Ofsted's three Regional Inspection Service Providers, being responsible for school inspections in the English Midlands.

=== Leisure ===
Serco Leisure Operating Ltd works with clients throughout the UK, running gyms, swimming pools, cycle hire schemes and National Sports Centres.

In February 2024, the UK Information Commissioner's Office issued an enforcement notice against Serco Leisure Operating and several associated leisure trusts over their use of facial recognition and fingerprint scanning to monitor staff attendance, finding that the biometric processing was not necessary or proportionate under UK data protection law.

=== Information technology ===
Starting in 2005, Serco administered the publicly funded UK Business Link website until its closure in 2012. During 2007, it was awarded a five-year tender to run the IT Infrastructure for the London Borough of Southwark.

=== Waste and recycling services ===
Serco operates recycling and waste collection services for various local councils.

== Outside the UK ==
=== Africa ===
==== Mauritius ====
The 2017 Paradise Papers revealed that the legal services firm Appleby had carried out a risk assessment of Serco in which the company was noted to have had a "history of problems, failures, fatal errors and overcharging" and had faced allegations of fraud and cover-ups.

=== Asia ===
==== Hong Kong ====
Since 2010s, Serco has been contracted to operate Hong Kong's Cross-Harbour Tunnel., and operates several other tunnels in the New Territories. Additonalty, the company offers integrated facilities management for public hospitals and healthcare facilities. In October 2025, AEON Delight, the facilities management division of Japan's major retailer AEON Group, acquired all assets from Serco in Hong Kong.

==== United Arab Emirates ====
Serco provides air traffic control services at international airports in the United Arab Emirates. It also operates the Dubai Metro, the Dubai Tram and the Palm Jumeirah Monorail in Dubai.

=== Europe ===
Serco formerly operated the Copenhagen Metro in Copenhagen, Denmark, with Ansaldo STS, until it sold its share in January 2008.

During 2013, Serco and its Swedish joint venture partner Strömma Tourism & Maritime secured an eight-year contract to operate four Djurgården ferries on behalf of Stockholm County Council and public ferry company Waxholms Ångfartygs.

==== Germany ====
Since 2010, Serco has operated Germany's first partly privatised prison at Hünfeld, Hesse.

With its subsidiaries ORS and European Homecare, Serco operates a total of 130 refugee accommodations in Germany and is by far the largest private service provider (as of 2024). In April 2024, the state of Berlin terminated three contracts with the Serco subsidiary ORS to operate refugee accommodation due to "serious deficiencies". When an asylum seeker died in an ORS facility, the staff did not notice for four weeks.

=== North America ===
==== Canada ====
Serco, through a purpose-made division Serco DES, holds a ten-year, CA$114 million contract with the Ministry of Transportation of Ontario to operate Ontario's DriveTest driver examination centres. These tests include vision, road, and knowledge tests for all persons seeking to become a licensed automobile driver in the province.

==== United States ====
In July 2013, Serco Inc. (the North American division of Serco Group) was awarded a US$1.25 billion contract from the Centers for Medicare and Medicaid Services (a division of the Department of Health and Human Services (HHS) to provide Eligibility Support Services (i.e., the "CMS-ESS" contract), in support of the Patient Protection and Affordable Care Act. This contract makes Serco one of the most highly paid government contractors in the US.

Additionally, Serco performs classification for all incoming US patents, via its contract with the U.S. Patent and Trademark Office.

Serco has a contract with the City of Chicago, Illinois, to enforce parking meter regulations.

Serco provides air traffic control services at many airports in the United States and Canada. Between 2004 and 2005, Serco operated a £5 million per year contract from the US government to manage multiple airports in Iraq.

In 2022, Serco was selected by the United States Defense Advanced Research Projects Agency (DARPA) to develop the first generation No Manning Required Ship (NOMARS).

=== Oceania ===
==== Australia ====
===== Transport =====
Between 1996 and 2005, Serco operated TransAdelaide bus services in Adelaide. During November 1995, Serco began a contract to provide transport information services for Transperth and, in May 1996, a separate contract to maintain all of its bus stations.

Between 1997 and 2015, Serco owned the train operator Great Southern Rail, which operated The Ghan, Indian Pacific and The Overland passenger trains. In March 2015, the business was sold to Allegro Funds.

In Sydney, Serco has operated transport information services for Transport for NSW since July 2010.

===== Justice and Immigration =====
As of July 2020, Serco operates Acacia Prison in Western Australia, Australia's largest prison facility, as well as the Adelaide Remand Centre in South Australia. Serco and its subcontractor, MSS Security, have been criticised for abuses.

Between 1990 and 2012, the company ran the Borallon Correctional Centre in Queensland, and also operated Wandoo Reintegration Facility in Western Australia between 2012 and 2018.

Starting in July 2009, Serco has held the national contract for various immigration detention centres, including the Christmas Island Immigration Reception and Processing Centre and the Villawood Immigration Detention Centre in Sydney. The Union of Christmas Island Workers highlighted the systemic failure by Serco to manage the Christmas Island Immigration Reception and Processing Centre, where a large number of refugees, including 1,000 children, were detained at its peak around 2013. Under Serco, there was an increase of deaths in custody and self-harm in the years leading up to 2013, as well as a deterioration of facilities, leading to the decline of the physical and the mental health of detainees and of staff. Ombudsman Allan Asher stated "In the first week of June when I visited Christmas Island, more than 30 incidents of self-harm by detainees held there were reported". Serco, in a staged memo leaked to The Australian, blamed the detainees for "creating a culture of self-harm" as a "bargaining tool". The former manager of the detention centre stated the centre was grossly understaffed.

==== New Zealand ====
During February 2011, Serco started operating the Mount Eden remand prison in Auckland, New Zealand. The firm was heavily criticized for the existence of 'fight clubs' within Mount Eden prison that were not investigated until after their existence became public knowledge in July 2015 when footage emerged online and was reported by 1News. On 24 July 2015, Serco's contract to run Mount Eden prison was revoked; its operation was given back to the New Zealand Department of Corrections. Serco was ordered to pay NZ$8 million to the New Zealand government as a result of problems at Mount Eden Prison while it was under Serco's management. The New Zealand government did not accept that this was a failure of governmental contracting and oversight; it brought in correctional officers from afar to provide adequate staffing at Mount Eden, and had spent NZ$2 million by December 2016 housing up to 40 of them in Auckland hotels.

In March 2012, Serco was awarded a contract to build and operate a 960-bed prison at Wiri. During March 2022, Te Ao Māori News reported that prisoners at Auckland South Corrections Facility in Wiri were experiencing unliveable conditions, including the denial of prison visits, unjustified lockdowns, lack of access to medical care, and insufficient safeguards against COVID-19; Te Ao reported that these conditions had led to two suicides within the space of five months. In response, Serco disputed several incidents in Te Ao's report and defended the quality of its care and services provided to prisoners. That same month, Radio New Zealand reported that Serco was using interns to produce psychological reports on Wiri prisoners for the Parole Board.
