= Thoresby Colliery =

Former coal mine in Edwinstowe, Nottinghamshire

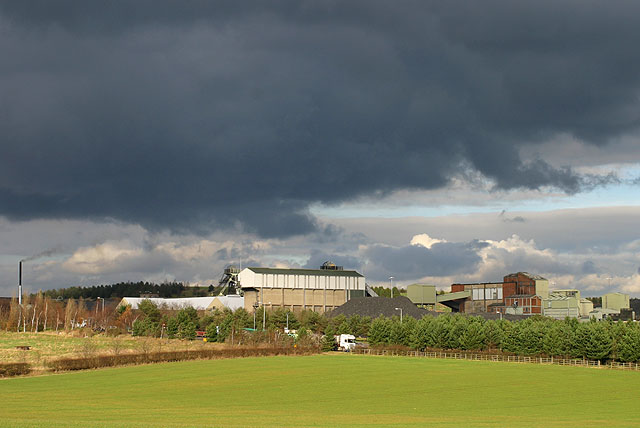
- Thoresby Colliery in February 2007

- Location in Nottinghamshire
- Location: Edwinstowe, NG21 9PS, Nottinghamshire, England; 53°12′00″N 1°03′06″W
- Products: Coal
- Opened: 1925
- Closed: 2015
- Company: Harworth Group

Road leading to colliery in 2014

Thoresby Colliery was a coal mine in north Nottinghamshire on the outskirts of Edwinstowe village. The mine, which opened in 1925, was the last working colliery in Nottinghamshire when it closed in 2015. The site has been cleared and is being redeveloped as a housing estate with school and country park.

== History ==
Thoresby colliery opened in 1925.

The first two shafts in 1925 were sunk to 690 metres (2,260 ft). The shafts were deepened by 109 metres (358 ft) in the 1950s. After privatisation of the National Coal Board in the 1990s the mine was taken over by RJB Mining (later UK Coal as UK Coal Thoresby Ltd).

Coal seams worked by, or available to, the pit included the Top Hard seam, the Parkgate seam (after closure of Ollerton Colliery in 1994); the Deep Soft seam; and the High Hazels seam (working ceased 1983). In a 2009 underground visit, Roger Helmer, then a European MP in the East Midlands region, stated he hoped the newly developed Deep Soft resource would provide coal extraction for a further ten years.

In April 2014 it was announced that the pit would close by July 2015. In May 2014, the TUC and NUM commissioned a report from Orion Innovations which hypothesised the government could apply for EU funding of £63million to £74m, which could be offset by profit of £86m from £500million of projected sales of coal from Thoresby and Kellingley until 2018.

The loss of miners' earnings was calculated at £163m, with additionally £75million loss of tax payments and national insurance contributions from proposed continued working.

In late May 2014, the first wave of redundancy letters had been prepared, and the colliery's 600 employees had been reduced to 360 by the time of the closure in July 2015. At the time of closure, Thoresby was one of the two last remaining deep-mined coal sources owned by UK Coal, together with Kellingley which closed soon after.

In 2015, the Thoresby Colliery Benevolent Fund, established in 1951, was wound up with £57,142 surplus which was distributed to five different local charities.

== Redevelopment ==
The site is being reclaimed and redeveloped by Harworth Group, with a ten-year plan into housing and associated infrastructure, named Thoresby Vale, Edwinstowe. Initial plans were to include a country park and with five acres set aside for a primary school. Local MP Mark Spencer mentioned that provision was also needed for a doctors' surgery, and hoped that section 106 monies could be used to upgrade the nearby traffic island and establish a passenger rail service extension to the Robin Hood Line.

Thoresby Vale Country Park opened in 2024. Thoresby Vale Primary Academy, part of the Diverse Academies Trust, opened in September 2025. Preparatory work to facilitate improvements to nearby Ollerton Roundabout started in November 2026, which will ultimately allow for more new-build housing as part of a phased expansion dictated by planning consent.

== Thoresby Colliery Band ==
Thoresby Colliery Band is a brass band first established in 1948 mostly by coal mine workers. The band was invited to deliver an open-air performance at Queen Elizabeth's Academy's 450-year anniversary celebration weekend of 16–17 June, 2011.

Latterly, the band are based in Hardwick Village, Nottinghamshire.
