= Gateway 45 =

Mixed use business park in Leeds, West Yorkshire, England

Coordinates: 53.775°N 1.480°W

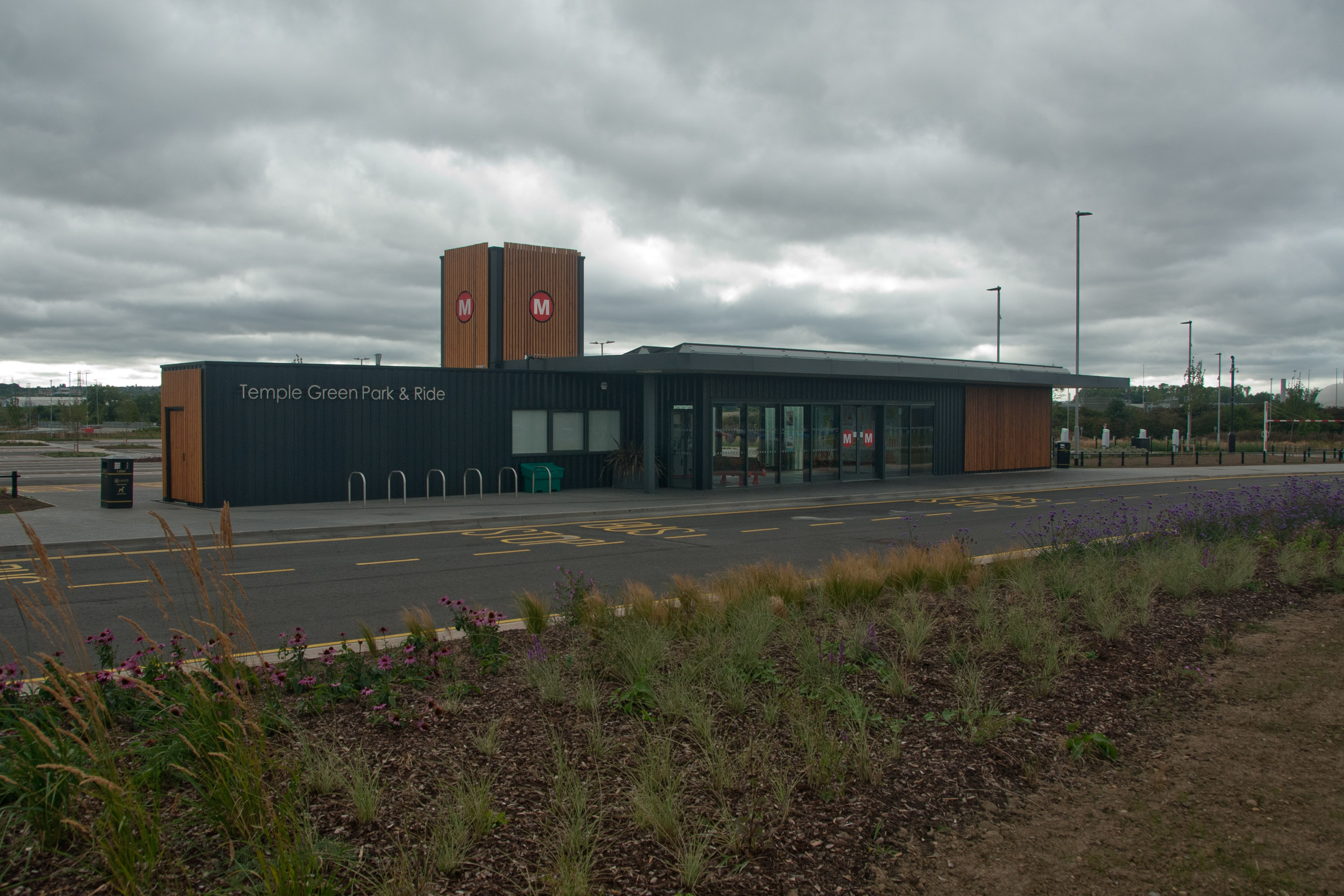
Temple Green Park and Ride building at Gateway 45 in Leeds

Gateway 45 is an industrial estate and park and ride location on the south eastern edge of Leeds, West Yorkshire, England. The site was initially developed under the name Temple Green and is located with the M1 Motorway on its southern edge and the A63 road on its eastern edge.

In July 2018, it was announced that the site had been selected as the location of the planned High Speed 2 phase 2 rolling stock maintenance depot.

== History ==
The 165-acre (67 ha) site is located on farmland and former industrial land with planning consent for over 2,600,000 square feet (240,000 m^{2}). It is next to the M1 Motorway and the A63, which is known as the East Leeds Link Road. (Note: The joint partnership is known as Aire Valley Land and owns 72 acres (290,000 m^{2}) of land in the area.) The M1 link road to the A1(M) opened in 1999, but whilst junction 45 was completed on the motorway, no roads radiated from it until the A63 opened into Leeds ten years later.

The site was originally known as Templegate and Temple Green when it was first developed in 2009, but has since been rebranded as Gateway 45. Initially, it was intended to straddle both sides of the motorway and include Skelton Lake, but the south side of the development was given permission in 2017 to open as a motorway service area, and the original plan for 1,800 houses has not featured in documents since 2015. In 2016, Harworth Group acquired a 50% stake in the venture which was previously held by other investment companies; as of 2018, the site is co-owned by Harworth and the Evans Property Group.

=== Park & Ride ===
Temple Green Park & Ride Phase One on the site opened in June 2017 and has 1,000 car parking spaces for a park and ride facility into Leeds city centre. Low emission buses run every ten to fifteen minutes from the site along the A63. The first phase totalled £9.1 million and involved the building of an extra 1 mile (1.2 km) of dual carriageway. In March 2019, a further 2.5 acres (1 ha) was bought to enable the Park & Ride scheme to expand.

=== HS2 depot ===
In July 2018, it was announced that a rolling stock facility for the proposed HS2 line would be located in Leeds in the Gateway 45 area. A depot was originally proposed in New Crofton (in nearby Wakefield) but the preferred option was at Leeds as the empty trains would have a shorter distance to travel and would therefore have a lesser environmental impact. The developers of Leeds Gateway, Evans Property Group and Harworth Group, suggested that the depot could be sited on land occupied by the former Skelton Grange power station. The depot was originally estimated to occupy over 150,000 square feet (14,000 m^{2}) which would remove a significant chunk of the proper development.

A year later, the Secretary of State for Transport confirmed that the maintenance facility would be located at Gateway 45. The facility was expected to create 125 skilled jobs for 24-hour maintenance of trains using HS2. The sidings were to be long enough to accommodate 38 200-metre (660 ft) trains for HS2, although four other trains would be stabled in York for operational purposes.

=== IHSRSI ===
In June 2019, it was announced that the University of Leeds' venture to create a Institute for High Speed Rail and System Integration (IHSRSI) would be built on land adjacent to the future HS2 depot. The University of Leeds and railway industry partners would contribute £40 million, the Leeds City Region Local Enterprise Partnership Growth Deal would add £13 million, and the UK Government would contribute £11 million. The institute would have three key areas of research on track, vehicles and signalling at up to 400 kilometres per hour (250 mph); "a testing facility for railway vehicle performance under simulated conditions, a facility to test the forces on track, ballast and support structures, and a System Integration and Innovation Centre to allow investigations to be conducted into digital signalling, power systems and electro-magnetic interference."
