= Kirkstall Power Station =

Former coal-fired power station in Leeds, England

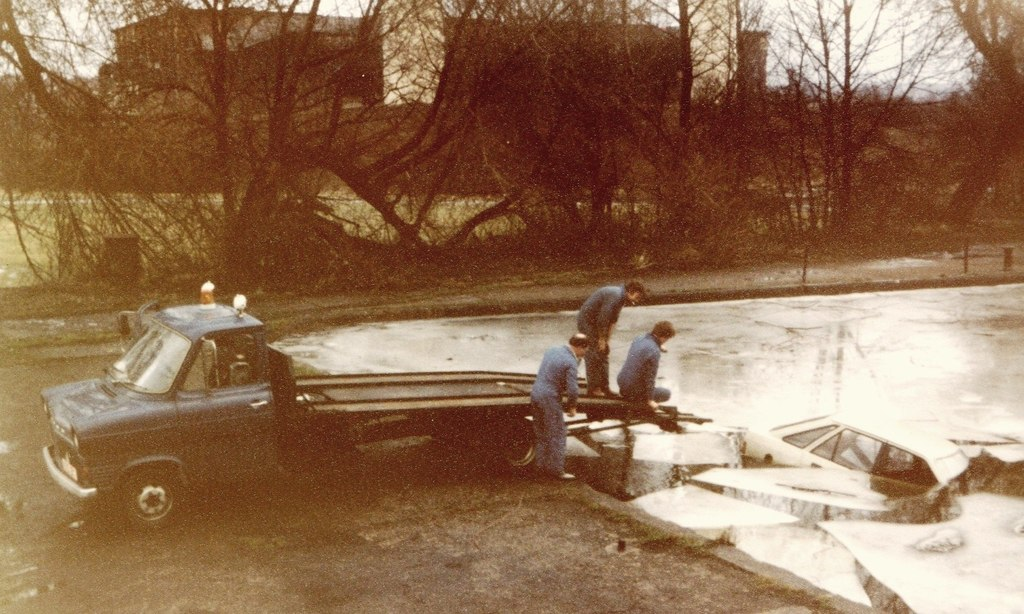
- Country: England
- Location: Kirkstall, Leeds, West Yorkshire, Yorkshire and the Humber
- Coordinates: 53.80421°N 1.59245°W
- Status: Decommissioned and demolished
- Construction began: 1928
- Commission date: 1930
- Decommission date: 1976
- Owners: Leeds Corporation (1926–1948); British Electricity Authority (1948–1955); Central Electricity Authority (1955–1957); Central Electricity Generating Board (1958–1976)
- Operator: As owner

Thermal power station
- Primary fuel: Coal
- Turbine technology: Steam turbines
- Chimneys: Originally 12, later 2
- Cooling towers: 2
- Cooling source: River water, cooling towers

Power generation
- Units decommissioned: All
- Nameplate capacity: 200 MW

Kirkstall Power Station was a coal-fired unit opened in 1930, serving the city of Leeds, West Yorkshire, England.

It was situated in Kirkstall by the River Aire north-west of Leeds and had its own wharf for delivery of coal via the Leeds and Liverpool Canal.

== History ==
The City of Leeds Corporation purchased the 104 acre (42.1 ha) Kirkstall site in 1926. Construction began in 1928, and the first electricity was generated in October 1930. The station was equipped with two British Thomson-Houston 25 MW turbo-alternators. An additional 30 MW turbo-alternator was ordered from BTH in 1935. Two 30 MW sets were added in 1948 powered by three 250,000 lb/hr boilers increasing combined generating capacity to around 200 MW.The station was later partly converted to oil firing during 1964, which rendered the coal sidings and associated shunters redundant.

The boilers were pulverised fuel and oil fired. There were 9 water tube Stirling/ International Combustion boilers working at 490 psi; in the 1947-48 extension there were International Combustion boilers operating at 650 psi. They were capable of delivering 2,370,000 lb/h (29.9 kg/s) of steam at 450 & 600 psi (31.0 & 41.4 bar) and 382/454 °C. The generating capacity in 1972 was 200 MW from five 30 MW turbo-alternators. Steam condensing and cooling was by river water and concrete cooling towers, each tower was rated at 2.5 million gallons per hour. In the year ending 31 March 1972 its load factor (the average load as a per cent of maximum output capacity) was 20.5 per cent.

The electricity output of the power station is shown in the tables. These comprised the HP plant with an installed capacity of 57 MW and the LP plant with an installed capacity of 133 MW.

Kirkstall HP electricity output
Year	1954	1955	1956	1957	1958
Electricity output, GWh	431.652	268.674	255.123	168.098	252.240

Kirkstall LP electricity output
Year	1954	1955	1956	1957	1958
Electricity output, GWh	217.763	258.833	193.914	175.352	166.855

Kirkstall combined electricity output
Year	1961	1962	1963	1967	1972
Electricity output, GWh	486.624	488.959	421.107	361.87	341.889

Kirkstall Power Station was closed in 1976 and was subsequently demolished, the cooling towers were demolished in 1979. None of the structure remains. The majority of the power station site is covered by a secure caravan storage depot, golf course and artificial football pitches with the rest of the site now forming part of the Kirkstall Valley Nature Reserve. The wharf used to unload coal is now a marina for canal and pleasureboats.

The major substations adjacent to the former power station still remain, supplying electrical power to much of Burley, Kirkstall, Armley and Bramley.

== Incidents ==
In March 1950 there were reports that grit and dirt had been discharged from the chimneys of Kirkstall Power Station. The matter was raised in Parliament and the Minister of Fuel and Power replied that the British Electricity Authority had been making alterations to the plant, which should reduce the nuisance. These included new electrostatic precipitators and ash handing plant.

In July 1956 scaffolding had been erected on a 320 ft chimney at the station. The scaffolding collapsed and four men fell 200 ft, one was killed and three badly injured.

== See also ==
- Skelton Grange Power Station
