= Harworth Bircotes =

Town in Nottinghamshire, England

Coordinates: 53.417°N 1.075°W

- Civil parish
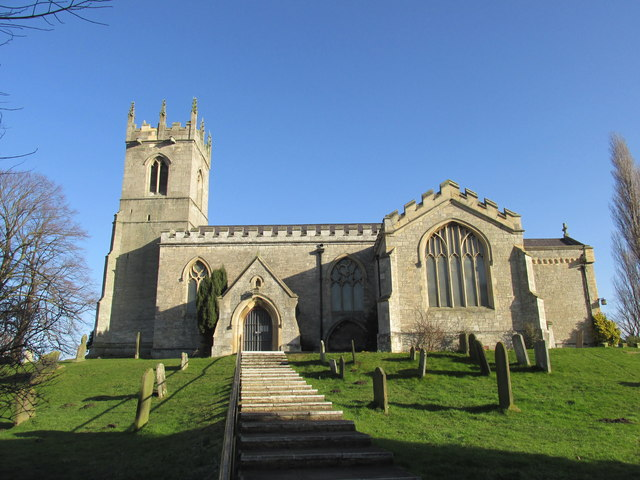
- All saints church

- Location within Nottinghamshire
- Interactive map of Harworth Bircotes
- Area: 2.79 sq mi (7.2 km^{2})
- Population: 8,886 (2021)
  - Density: 3,185/sq mi (1,230/km^{2})
- OS grid reference: SK 624919
  - London: 135 mi (217 km) SE
- District: Bassetlaw
- Shire county: Nottinghamshire
- Region: East Midlands
- Country: England
- Sovereign state: United Kingdom
- Places: Bircotes; Harworth
- Post town: Doncaster
- Postcode district: DN11
- Dialling code: 01302
- Police: Nottinghamshire
- Fire: Nottinghamshire
- Ambulance: East Midlands
- UK Parliament: Bassetlaw
- Website: http://www.harworthandbircotestowncouncil.org.uk

Harworth Bircotes or Harworth and Bircotes is a town and civil parish in the Bassetlaw district of Nottinghamshire in the East Midlands of England. The parish includes the settlements of Bircotes and Harworth. The parish was created on 1 April 1974 out of Harworth parish.

Harworth and Bircotes Town Council is the lowest tier of local government.

The population of the parish as recorded in the UK census 2021 was 8,886 residents.

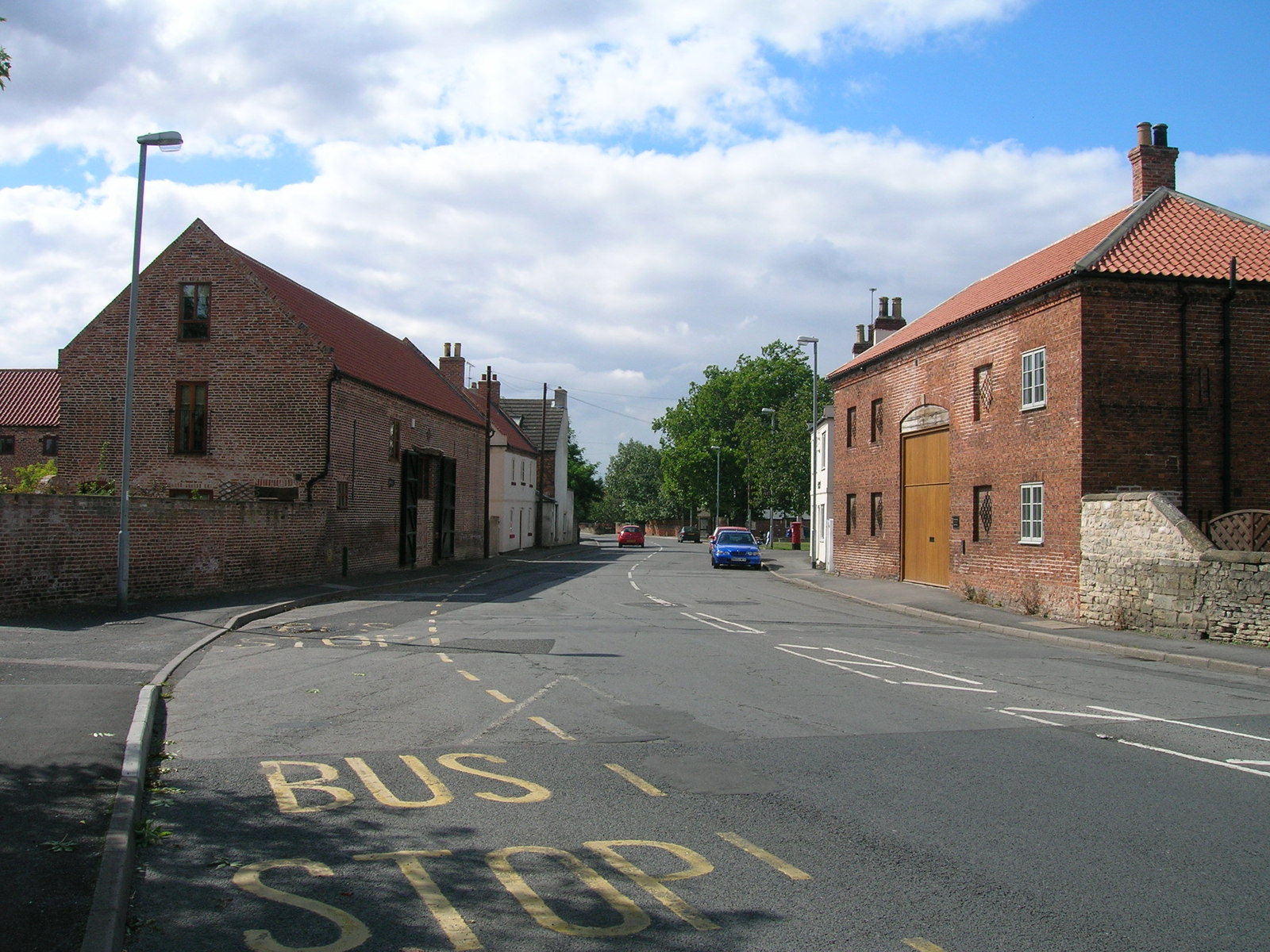
Main Street, Harworth

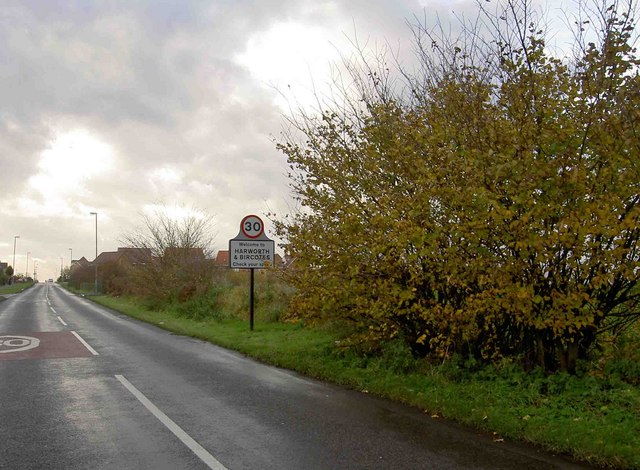
Harworth and Bircotes welcome sign

An annual Harcourt & Bircotes Pride event takes place, with its 4th iteration in 2025.

== See also ==
- Listed buildings in Harworth Bircotes
