= Harworth =

Coordinates: 53.417°N 1.075°W

- Town
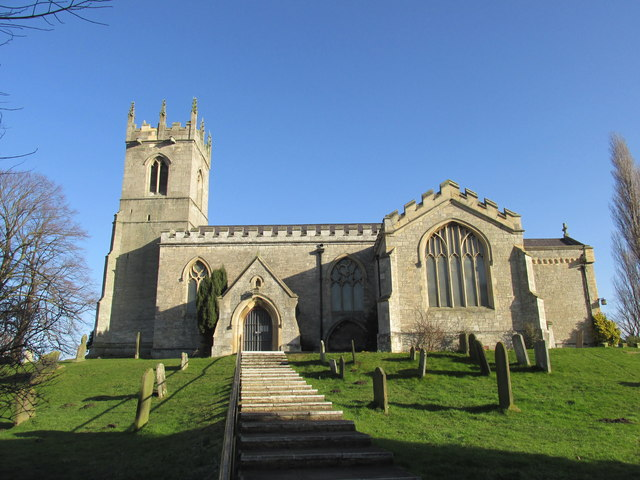
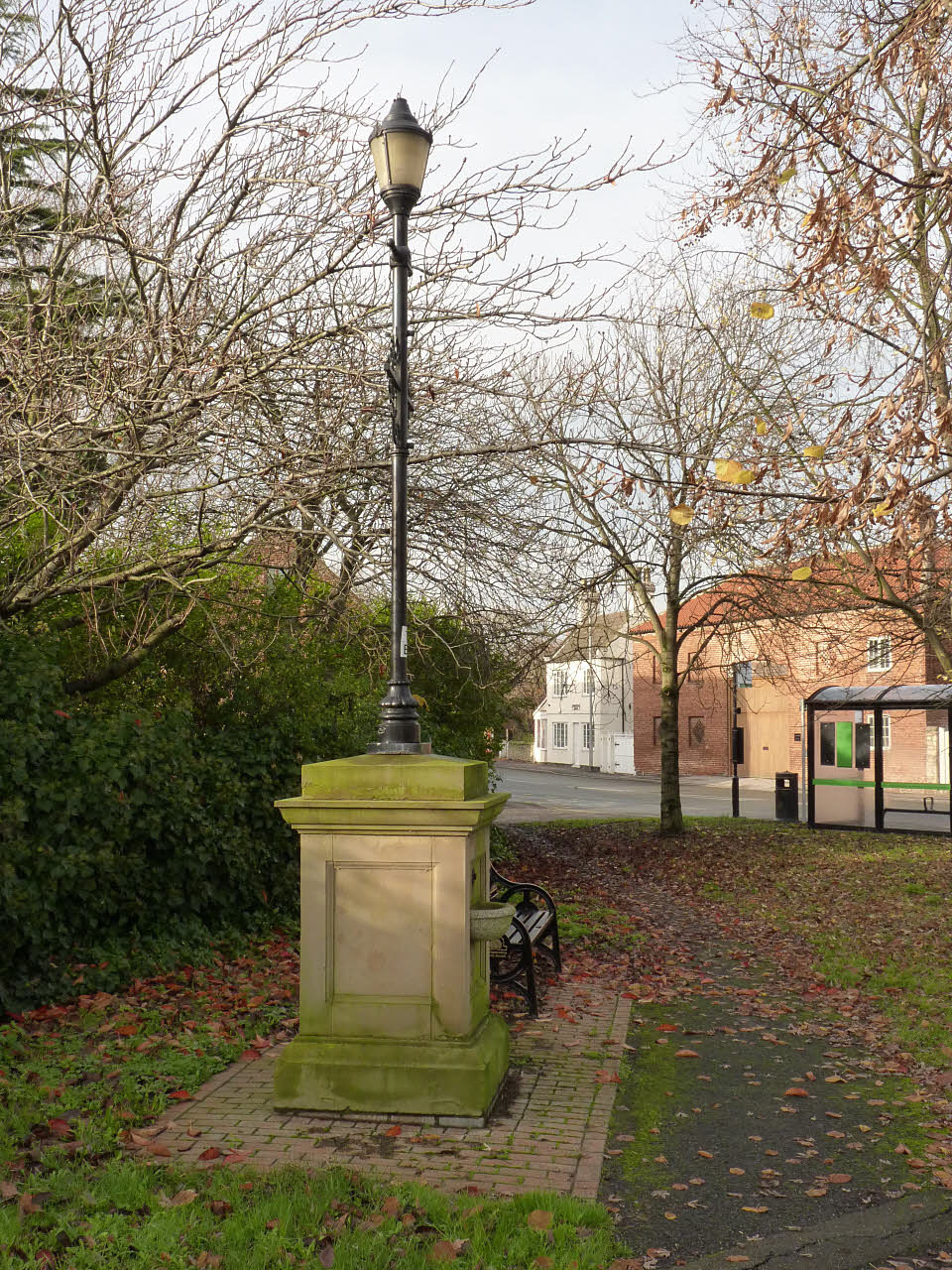
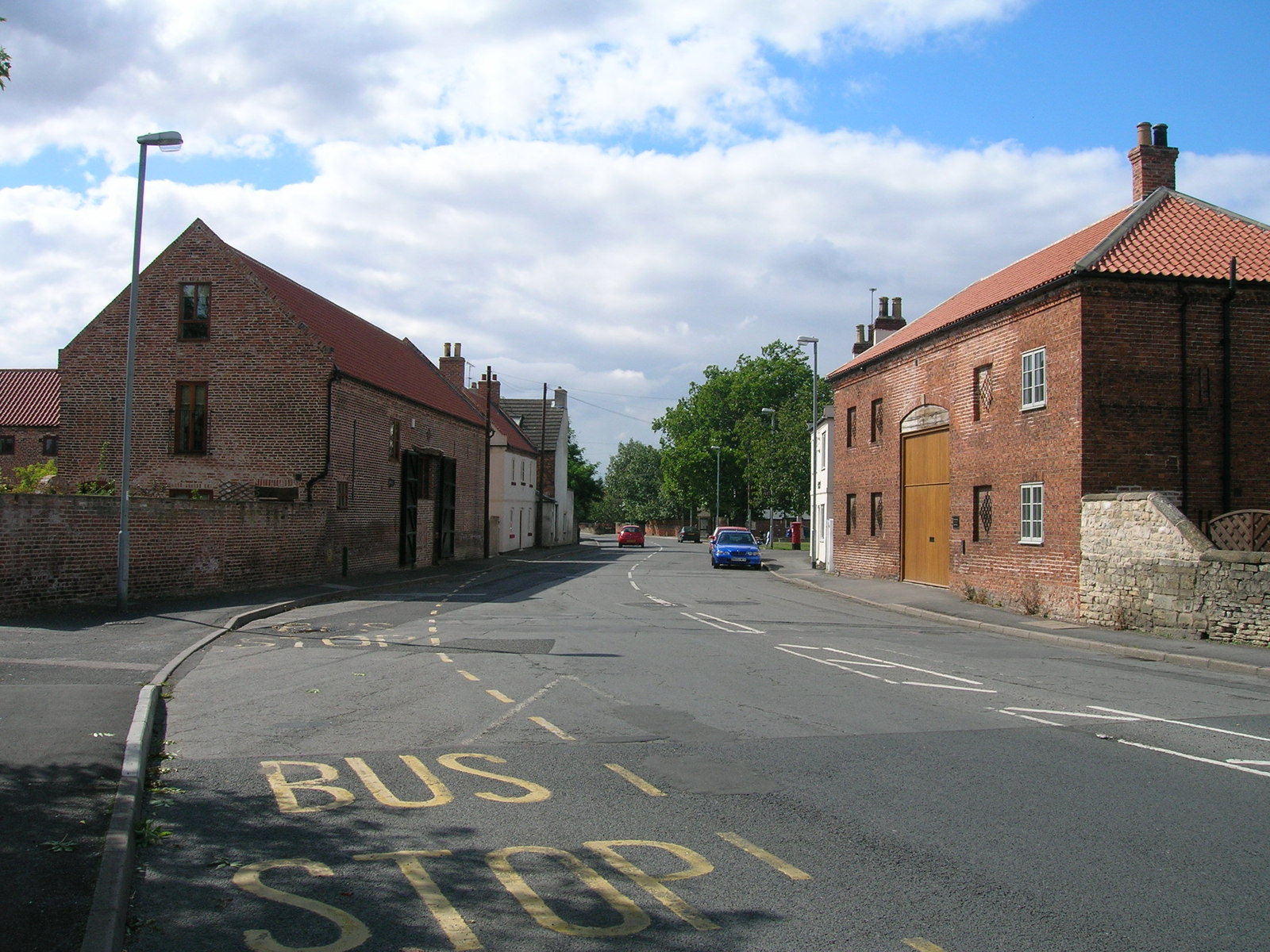
- All Saints' Church The Green Main Street

- Location within Nottinghamshire
- Population: 7,948 (2011)
- OS grid reference: SK615915
- Civil parish: Harworth Bircotes
- District: Bassetlaw
- Shire county: Nottinghamshire
- Region: East Midlands
- Country: England
- Sovereign state: United Kingdom
- Post town: DONCASTER
- Postcode district: DN11
- Dialling code: 01302
- Police: Nottinghamshire
- Fire: Nottinghamshire
- Ambulance: East Midlands
- UK Parliament: Bassetlaw
- Website: https://harworthandbircotestowncouncil.org.uk/

Harworth with Bircotes are a town in the civil parish of Harworth and Bircotes in the Bassetlaw district of Nottinghamshire, England, on the border with South Yorkshire. It is 8 miles (13 km) north of Worksop. The population of the civil parish of Harworth Bircotes was 7,948 in the 2011 Census.

== Etymology ==
The town's name is from Old English har "grey" (compare modern hoary") and worth (also worō, worþ) "enclosure". Harworth was recorded in the Domesday Book as Hareworde.

== History and Industrial Revolution ==
The Harworth coal mine opened in 1921 and produced coal for the power stations on the River Trent. A new pit tower was built in 1989 when the pit was at its peak of production but seven years later the colliery was 'mothballed'. In 2015, it was announced that the pit tower would be demolished and the colliery site would be redeveloped for housing which has since been completed. The former freight line and sidings into the colliery have been lifted and left undeveloped. The local football team is called Harworth Colliery F.C.

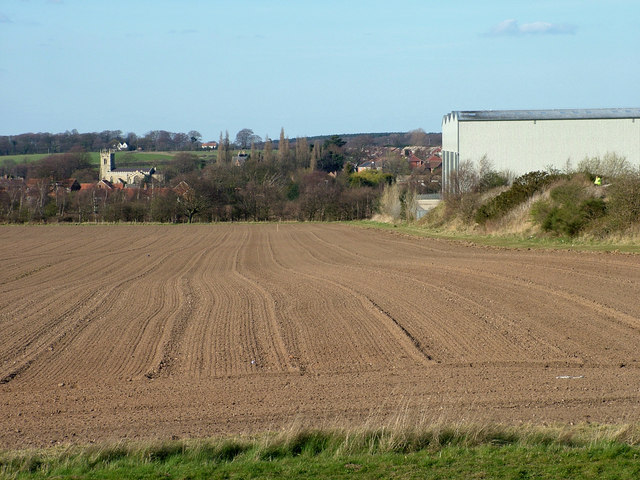
Industrial Units, Harworth with the tower of All Saints Church in the distance

In 1961 the parish had a population of 8,289. On 1 April 1974 the parish was split; part stayed in Nottinghamshire, being renamed "Harworth Bircotes", part was added to neighbouring Bawtry in South Yorkshire.

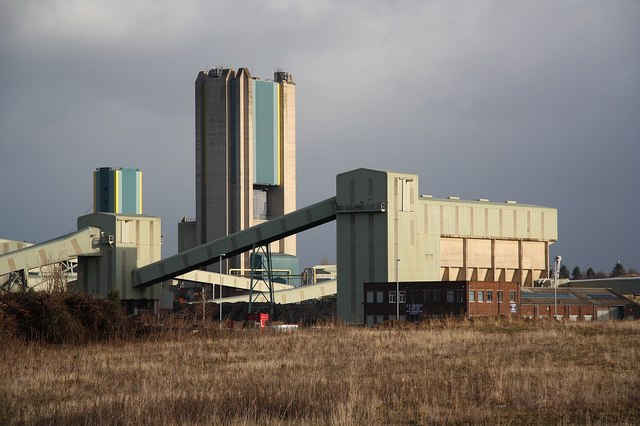
Harworth Colliery in 2009

== Notable people ==
The town – once a busy coalmining community – is particularly noteworthy as the home of Tom Simpson (1937–1967), one of Britain's greatest road racing cyclists, the World Champion in 1965. Simpson began his cycling career as a club member at Harworth and District Cycling Club. After his death on Mont Ventoux during the 1967 Tour de France, his body was brought back to Nottinghamshire and interred in Harworth's cemetery. A small museum dedicated to Simpson's achievements was opened in August 2001 and can be found in the Harworth and Bircotes sports and social club.

There is also a history of Gurkhas being here during the Second World War.

Author Lindsey Kelk hails from Harworth, and attended North Border Comprehensive School from 1992–99.

== Schools ==
There is a Church of England primary School in Harworth (Harworth Church of England Academy) and a Catholic primary school in Bircotes (St Patrick's Catholic Primary School). The town is also served by Serlby Park Academy, a 3–18 school in Bircotes.

== Places of worship ==
The Anglican parish church of All Saints is grade II listed and dates in part to the 12th century.

Harworth Methodist Church is a red brick building in Bircotes, having been built as a facility for the 1920s mining population.

St Patrick's Catholic Church was a wooden building built in the 1930s and included the Stations of the Cross carved in coal. It closed at Easter 2018, and the parish merged with that of St Helen, Oldcotes which later formed part of the parish of St Jude, Worksop.

== Listed buildings in Harworth ==
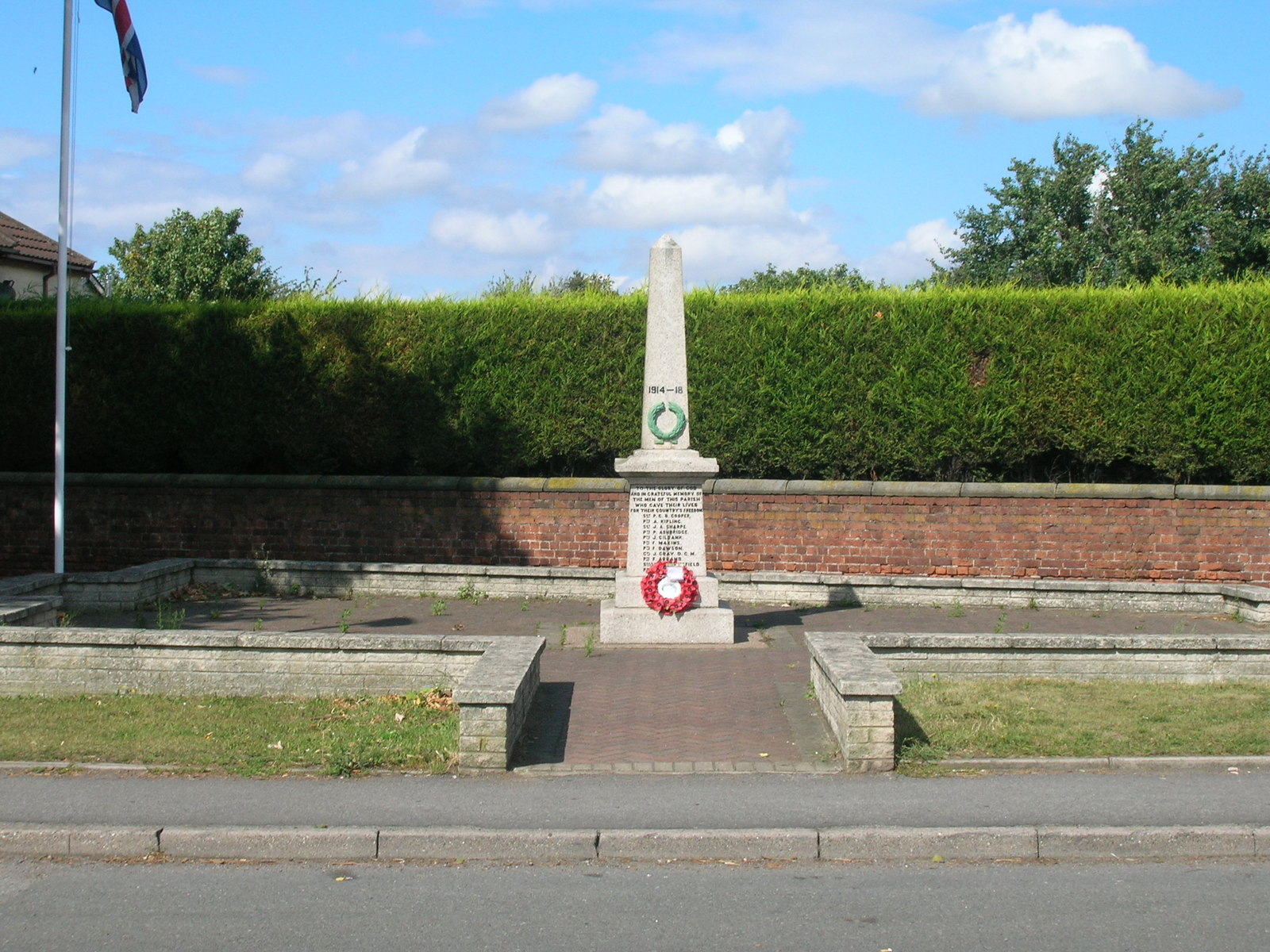
Harworth war memorial

All Saints Church, the war memorial, and six properties in Main Street, Harworth (three barns and three houses) are grade II listed buildings.
