= UK Coal =

Private mining firm in the United Kingdom

UK Coal Production Ltd
- Company type: Private
- Industry: Coal mining, Renewable energy and Real estate
- Founded: 1974
- Defunct: 18 December 2015
- Headquarters: Harworth, Nottinghamshire, England
- Key people: Kevin McCullough (Chief Executive)
- Revenue: £316.0 million (2009)
- Operating income: £82.7 million (2007)
- Net income: £94.0 million (2007)
- Number of employees: 2,000 (2013)

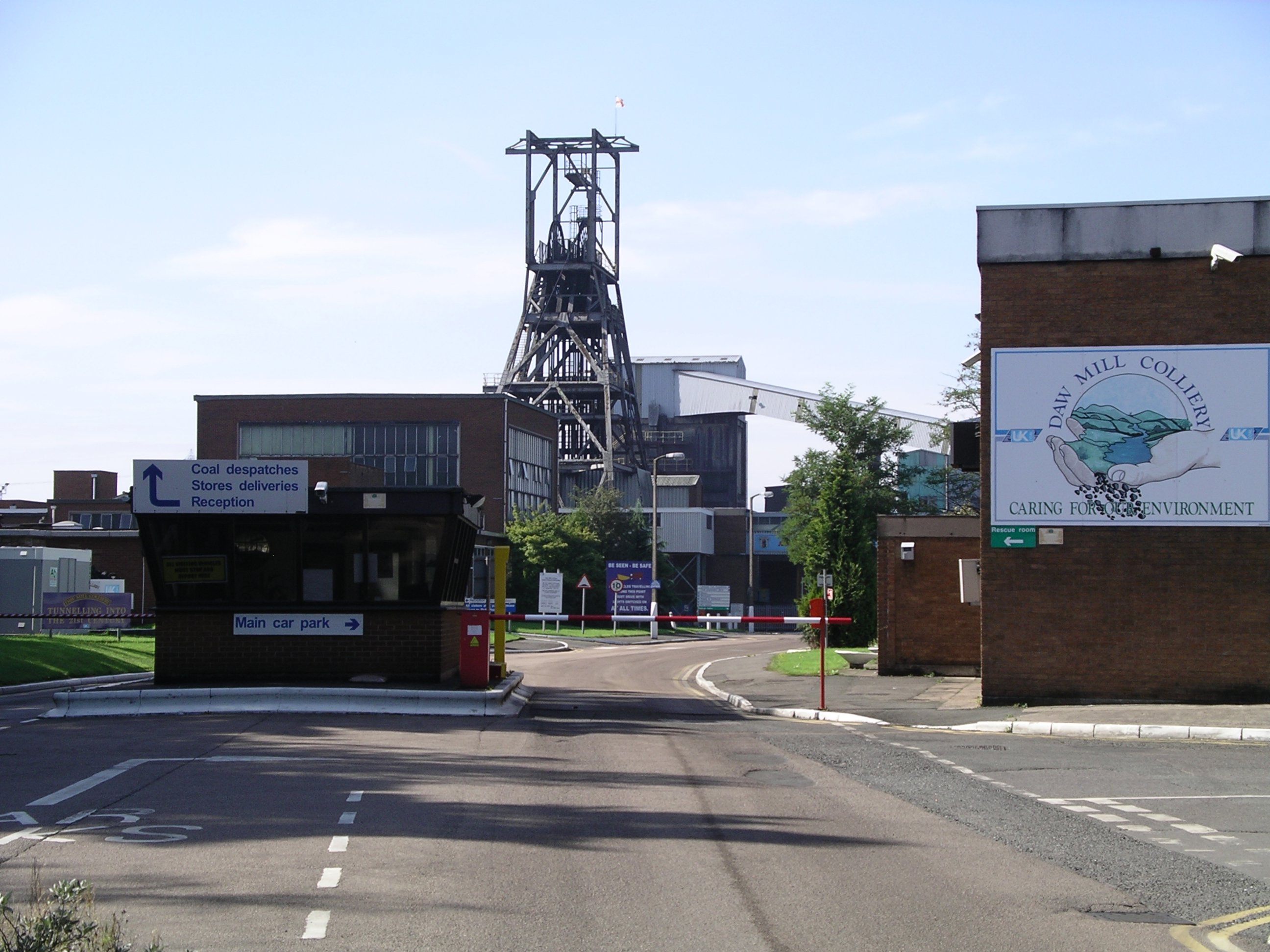
Daw Mill Colliery, Warwickshire, England

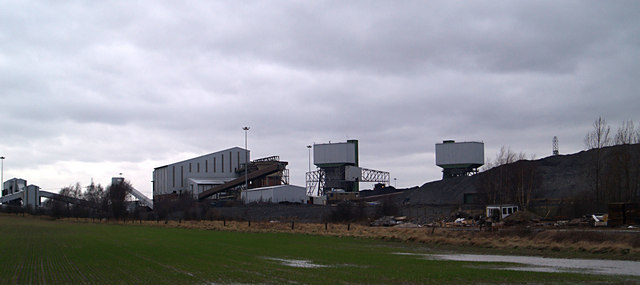
Kellingley Colliery laid in both North and West Yorkshire.

UK Coal Production Ltd, formerly UK Coal plc, was the largest coal mining business in the United Kingdom. The company was based in Harworth, in Nottinghamshire. The company was a constituent of the FTSE 250 Index. The successor company that contains the former property division, Harworth Group, is still listed on the London Stock Exchange.

== History ==
The predecessor company of UK Coal was founded by Richard J. Budge in 1974 as RJB Mining. In 1994, following the privatisation of the UK mining industry, it grew fivefold with the acquisition of British Coal's core activities. It changed its name to UK Coal in 2001 after the retirement of its founder, having acquired UK Coal plc.

== Former operations ==
At year end 2008, the company estimated coal reserves and resources of 105 Mt at the mines, of which 45 Mt was accessible under existing five year mining and investment plans. Its most important customers were electricity generators.

In 2010 the company proposed a series of developments, mainly open-cast mining, including the Minorca mine project development in Measham, Leicestershire. However, UK Coal exited surface mining in late 2014, so these plans did not materialise.

In 2012, UK Coal were fined £200,000 after pleading guilty to breaching health and safety laws after a death of a miner at Kellingley Colliery. One deep mine, the Welbeck colliery, in Nottinghamshire closed in 2011 after continuous production since 1912. Another deep mine, Daw Mill at Furnace End, Warwickshire, closed in 2013 after an underground fire damaged much of the facilities.

On 10 April 2014, Reuters reported that the British government was to give UK Coal a £10 million loan to help fund the closure of its two remaining deep mines. The company will carry out a managed closure of the deep mines by Autumn 2015 and will seek a buyer for its surface mines. UK Coal's difficulties were precipitated by a flood of U.S. coal on to the market, as a result of shale gas development, and by the strength of sterling.

Thoresby Colliery was closed in July 2015, while Kellingley Colliery ceased production on 18 December 2015, with ownership to be transferred to Harworth Estates for future redevelopment.

=== Former opencast mining operations ===
Three surface mines in North East England were owned by UK Coal Surface Mines Limited (company number 08492512) which went into administration on 14 November 2014. The business was then sold to UKCSMR Limited (company number 09275881). The three surface mines are Butterwell and Potland Burn in Northumberland and Park Wall North in County Durham.

=== Former renewable energy and gas operations ===
The company moved into renewable energy, expanding into wind farms, which is helped by a large land bank and the desire to diversify into energy activities beyond coal. Wind power offers financial incentives such as Renewables Obligation Certificates. UK Coal, through its Harworth Power subsidiary, engaged in mine gas recovery, to generate electricity.

Harworth Power was sold on 1 October 2012 to Red Rose Infrastructure Limited for £20.30 million. At the time of the sale, it operated 14 gas engines of 26 MW generation capacity supplying electricity to UK Coal and the National Grid.

=== Restructuring ===
On 12 December 2012 UK Coal plc completed a complex financial restructuring of the company to secure its future and changed its name to Coalfield Resources plc. The company's operations were restructured into two separate businesses: the mining division (under UK Coal Mine Holdings Limited) and the property division (under Harworth Estates Property Group Limited).

Control of the mining division had passed to an employee benefit trust ("EBT"), which initially held shares representing 67% of the voting and 10% of the economic rights in UK Coal Mine Holdings for the benefit of current and future employees of the mining division. Coalfield Resources initially retained the remainder of UK Coal Mine Holdings's economic and voting rights, but the shareholdings rank behind pension fund debt. On 9 July 2013, following a devastating fire, their largest mine, Daw Mill, was forced into closure. As a direct result both UK Coal Mine Holdings Ltd (UKCMHL) and UK Coal Operations Ltd (UKCOL) were put into administration. The remaining mining operations were again restructured, resulting in the formation of a new business "UK Coal Production Ltd".

The successor of Coalfield Resources, Harworth Group, had no equity interest in the mining business by the time the last two mines were closed in 2015. Harworth Group initially (in 2012) owned 24.9% of Harworth Estates Property Group, with 75.1% having passed to EBT in return for a £30 million cash injection and their financial support to the mines. However, in November 2014 Coalfield Resources announced that it had agreed terms with the Pension Protection Fund to buy back the 75.1% of Harworth Estates Property Group it did not already own and to change the name of the company to Harworth Group plc. This transaction was completed on 24 March 2015.

== Current operations ==
The company is no longer active in mining. On 18 December 2015 the company closed its last deep mine located in Yorkshire, at Kellingley. Surface mines were sold to UKCSMR Limited in late 2014. Coal extraction declined from 37.1 million tonnes in 1995 to around 7 million tonnes in 2009.

Only the former property division operates as the successor company Harworth Estates (wholly owned by the Harworth Group).

At the end of 2007, Harworth Estates' land was estimated to be worth £411 million. The estate assets are primarily in business parks, industrial sites and agriculture, with a smaller portfolio of residential property (residential assets associated with agricultural properties). Harworth Estates manage, develop and regenerate their extensive portfolio of land totalling over 30,000 acres (12,000 ha).

Harworth Estates is now wholly owned by the Harworth Group, which had divested its equity interest in the mining operations before the restructuring of March 2015.

== See also ==
- Coal mining in the United Kingdom
