= Grade II* listed buildings in North West Leicestershire =

There are over 20,000 Grade II* listed buildings in England. This page is a list of these buildings in North West Leicestershire.

== North West Leicestershire ==
Name	Location	Type	Completed (Note: The date given is the date used by Historic England as significant for the initial building or that of an important part in the structure's description.)	Date designated	Grid ref. (Note: The grid reference is based on the British national grid reference system, sometimes known as OSGB36, used by the Ordnance Survey.) Geo-coordinates	Entry number (Note: The "List Entry Number" is a unique number assigned to each listed building and scheduled monument by Historic England.)	Image
Church of St Michael	Appleby Magna, North West Leicestershire	Church	14th century	24 November 1965	SK3150209850; 52°41′08″N 1°32′08″W	1177814	Church of St Michael More images
The Moat House	Appleby Magna, North West Leicestershire	House	16th century	16 December 1952	SK3160409798; 52°41′06″N 1°32′02″W	1361263	The Moat House
Former Midland Railway Station	Ashby-de-la-Zouch, North West Leicestershire	Railway Station	1849	8 May 1950	SK3554916267; 52°44′34″N 1°28′30″W	1361623	Former Midland Railway Station More images
Glenridding Mansion House	Ashby-de-la-Zouch, North West Leicestershire	House	Mid 18th century	8 May 1950	SK3544816666; 52°44′47″N 1°28′35″W	1073669	Glenridding Mansion House More images
Ley Farmhouse	Ashby-de-la-Zouch, North West Leicestershire	Farmhouse	16th century	29 September 1977	SK3679621249; 52°47′15″N 1°27′21″W	1073666	Upload Photo
Loudoun Monument	Ashby-de-la-Zouch, North West Leicestershire	Commemorative Monument	1879	8 May 1950	SK3564216580; 52°44′44″N 1°28′24″W	1073662	Loudoun Monument More images
Rawdon House and Rawdon Terrace	Ashby-de-la-Zouch, North West Leicestershire	Terrace	Early 19th century	26 May 1970	SK3561616521; 52°44′43″N 1°28′26″W	1073593	Upload Photo
The Bulls Head	Ashby-de-la-Zouch, North West Leicestershire	Apartment	Early 19th century	8 May 1950	SK3586216804; 52°44′52″N 1°28′13″W	1188696	The Bulls Head More images
The Royal Hotel	Ashby-de-la-Zouch, North West Leicestershire	Hotel	c. 1826	8 May 1950	SK3560316430; 52°44′40″N 1°28′27″W	1073594	The Royal Hotel More images
Church of St John the Baptist	Belton, North West Leicestershire	Parish Church	14th century	7 December 1962	SK4476920818; 52°46′59″N 1°20′16″W	1074123	Church of St John the Baptist More images
Church of St Edward King and Martyr	Castle Donington, North West Leicestershire	Parish Church	Early 13th century	7 December 1962	SK4470527333; 52°50′30″N 1°20′16″W	1361370	Church of St Edward King and Martyr More images
Donington Hall and Attached Chapel, Stables and Game Room	Donington Park, Castle Donington, North West Leicestershire	Country House	1790-3	7 December 1962	SK4205326875; 52°50′16″N 1°22′38″W	1074144	Donington Hall and Attached Chapel, Stables and Game Room More images
Church of St Mary	Coleorton, North West Leicestershire	Parish Church	14th century	24 November 1965	SK3907517248; 52°45′05″N 1°25′21″W	1073571	Church of St Mary More images
Coleorton Hall	Coleorton, North West Leicestershire	Country House	1804-1808	24 November 1965	SK3912117312; 52°45′07″N 1°25′19″W	1361611	Coleorton Hall More images
Grotto and Pool South East of Coleorton Hall	Coleorton, North West Leicestershire	Grotto	1806	24 August 1999	SK3916817200; 52°45′04″N 1°25′16″W	1067353	Upload Photo
Church of St John the Baptist	Heather, North West Leicestershire	Parish Church	Early 14th century	24 November 1965	SK3900810841; 52°41′38″N 1°25′27″W	1073579	Church of St John the Baptist More images
The Manor House with Garden Wall	Heather, North West Leicestershire	House	Early 18th century	24 November 1965	SK3899310784; 52°41′36″N 1°25′28″W	1177219	Upload Photo
Church of St Denys and Paget Tombs in Churchyard	Ibstock, North West Leicestershire	Parish Church	Early 14th century	7 November 1966	SK4045309562; 52°40′56″N 1°24′11″W	1074370	Church of St Denys and Paget Tombs in Churchyard More images
Langley Priory and Attached Railings	Isley cum Langley, North West Leicestershire	House	Late 16th century	29 December 1952	SK4336423546; 52°48′28″N 1°21′29″W	1083563	Upload Photo
Church of St Andrew	Kegworth, North West Leicestershire	Parish Church	13th century	7 December 1962	SK4875826713; 52°50′09″N 1°16′40″W	1084364	Church of St Andrew More images
The Nunnery	Hemington, Lockington-Hemington, North West Leicestershire	Kitchen	c. 1530	7 December 1962	SK4562927825; 52°50′46″N 1°19′26″W	1074176	Upload Photo
Church of All Saints	Long Whatton and Diseworth, North West Leicestershire	Parish Church	Late 12th century or early 13th century	7 December 1962	SK4823623320; 52°48′19″N 1°17′09″W	1064262	Church of All Saints More images
Church of St Michael	Diseworth, Long Whatton and Diseworth, North West Leicestershire	Parish Church	11th century to 12th century	7 December 1962	SK4537024530; 52°48′59″N 1°19′42″W	1068865	Church of St Michael More images
Church of St Lawrence	Measham, North West Leicestershire	Church	Early 14th century	24 November 1965	SK3352812218; 52°42′24″N 1°30′19″W	1295291	Church of St Lawrence More images
Church of the Holy Trinity	Normanton Le Heath, North West Leicestershire	Parish Church	early 14th century	24 November 1965	SK3773412773; 52°42′41″N 1°26′34″W	1074376	Church of the Holy Trinity More images
Church of St Mary	Osgathorpe, North West Leicestershire	Parish Church	14th century	24 November 1965	SK4311819518; 52°46′18″N 1°21′44″W	1074377	Church of St Mary More images
Church of the Holy Rood	Packington, North West Leicestershire	Church	13th century	24 November 1965	SK3585614499; 52°43′37″N 1°28′14″W	1361255	Church of the Holy Rood More images
Chaplains House and Chapel at Ravenstone Hospital	Ravenstone with Snibstone, North West Leicestershire	Clergy House	1784	24 November 1965	SK4010313841; 52°43′15″N 1°24′28″W	1361214	Upload Photo
Church of St Michael	Ravenstone with Snibstone, North West Leicestershire	Parish Church	Early 14th century	24 November 1965	SK4020313916; 52°43′17″N 1°24′22″W	1074380	Church of St Michael More images
Ravenstone Hall	Ravenstone with Snibstone, North West Leicestershire	Country House	c. 1750	24 November 1965	SK4005313954; 52°43′18″N 1°24′30″W	1177459	Upload Photo
Ravenstone Hospital	Ravenstone with Snibstone, North West Leicestershire	Almshouse	1711	16 December 1952	SK4012413864; 52°43′15″N 1°24′27″W	1177479	Ravenstone Hospital
Beech House	Snarestone, North West Leicestershire	House	c. 1700	24 November 1965	SK3450309312; 52°40′49″N 1°29′28″W	1074316	Beech House More images
Gateway to Garden	Staunton Harold, North West Leicestershire	Gate	1681	24 November 1965	SK3796920858; 52°47′02″N 1°26′19″W	1074346	Upload Photo
The Golden Gates and Bridge	Staunton Harold, North West Leicestershire	Gate	Late 17th century	24 November 1965	SK3805520965; 52°47′06″N 1°26′14″W	1074347	The Golden Gates and Bridge More images
Church of St Michael	Stretton en le Field, North West Leicestershire	Church	14th century	24 November 1965	SK3039811923; 52°42′15″N 1°33′06″W	1074318	Church of St Michael More images
Church of St Peter	Swepstone, North West Leicestershire	Church	14th century	24 November 1965	SK3678510565; 52°41′29″N 1°27′26″W	1178132	Church of St Peter More images
Church of St Matthew	Worthington, North West Leicestershire	Parish Church	12th century	24 November 1965	SK4065220679; 52°46′56″N 1°23′55″W	1361236	Church of St Matthew More images
Church of St John the Baptist	Hugglescote, North West Leicestershire	Church	1878	31 October 1983	SK4272412759; 52°42′39″N 1°22′09″W	1361240	Church of St John the Baptist More images
Church of St John the Baptist	Whitwick, North West Leicestershire	Church	Late 13th century	8 November 1949	SK4350116193; 52°44′30″N 1°21′26″W	1178164	Church of St John the Baptist More images
The Manor House	Donington Le Heath, North West Leicestershire	Farmhouse	c. 1280	8 November 1949	SK4201212657; 52°42′36″N 1°22′47″W	1074361	Upload Photo
