= All Saints Church, Long Whatton =

Church in Long Whatton, Leicestershire

Coordinates: 52.8053°N 1.2860°W

All Saints' Church, Long Whatton
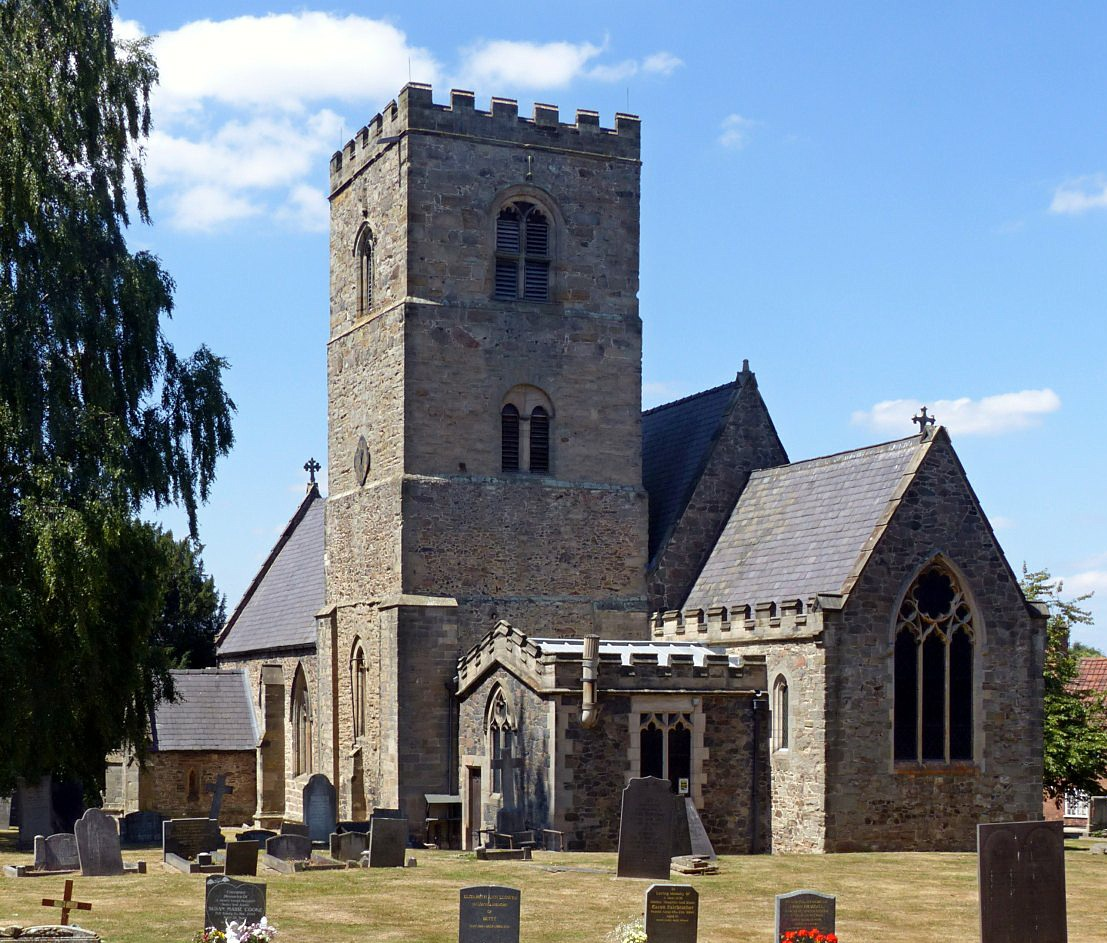
- All Saints' Church, Long Whatton
- All Saints' Church, Long Whatton
- OS grid reference: SK 48236 23320
- Location: Long Whatton
- Country: England
- Denomination: Church of England

Architecture
- Heritage designation: Grade II* listed

Administration
- Province: Canterbury
- Diocese: Leicester
- Archdeaconry: Loughborough
- Deanery: Akeley East

All Saints Church is a parish church located in the village of Long Whatton, Leicestershire, England. Built in the 13th century, the church was renovated between the 14th and 16th centuries. The church was partly rebuilt in the mid-19th century. A medieval chancel screen and early 17th century pulpit were donated to the church by Thomas Brooks, Lord Crawshaw in the late 19th century. The church is recorded in the National Heritage List for England as a designated Grade II* listed building.

== Description ==
The 13th century church was built with rubble stone. Renovations occurred in the 14th to 16th centuries. The north aisle was built in the early 14th century; the south aisle was added in late 14th century. The layout consists of a nave with aisles, chancel, south vestry, tower and south porch. The chancel has a 2-light north window and a large 3-light east window. The vestry is 19th-20th century with traceried windows and south door.

The nave arcades feature double-chamfered arches supported by octagonal piers. The north arcade, with five bays, has shorter arches and capitals of a different design than the taller, three-bay south arcade. A clerestory with 2-light traceried windows was added in the 19th century. Each aisle holds a piscina. The chancel arch holds a piscina and sedilia. A circular 12th century font has been restored. There are restored traceried wooden screens in the north aisle with 15th and 16th century fragments.

The tower is made up of three stages. The lower, 13th century stage has clasping buttresses. The lower and middle stages have lancet windows. The middle stage has east, west and north windows that date to the early 13th century. The top stage, added in the 15th to 16th centuries, has a battlement parapet and 2-light windows with cusped tracery. The west facade of the church has three steep gables, each with 3-light windows. The south porch is gabled and flanked by gabled buttresses.

== History ==
The church was founded in the late 12th century. The building was constructed in stages from the 13th to the 14th century. The north and south aisles were built in the 14th century. The early 13th century tower has the earliest surviving architectural features of the church. An upper stage with battlement parapet was added in the late 15th century. During the mid-19th century, there were major renovations to the Church, all in the Decorated Gothic style.. These included the shortening and reconstruction of the chancel, adding a new slate roof to the nave and traceried windows. The medieval chancel screen, originally belonging to a ruined church at Colston Bassett, was donated in 1894 by Lord Crawshaw in memory of his daughter Alice. Lord Crawshaw also donated a 1613 puplit with decorative arcading to commemorate Queen Victoria’s Jubilee in 1897. In 1931 the Lancaster architect Henry Paley of Austin and Paley added a baptistry as a memorial to Lord Crawshaw.

The church is recorded in the National Heritage List for England as a designated Grade II* listed building.

== See also ==
- Grade II* listed buildings in North West Leicestershire
- List of ecclesiastical works by Austin and Paley (1916–44)
