= Elisabeth Mace =

British writer

Elisabeth Mace (born 1933) is a British author of young adult speculative fiction.

Her first novels were a trilogy of post-apocalyptic novels beginning with Ransome Revisited (1975). Her last published novel was Under Siege (1988), in which video game characters come to life.

== Works ==
All published by André Deutsch in London.

Leven sequence

- Ransome Revisited (1975); US title: Out There
- The Travelling Man (1975)
- The Rushton Inheritance (1978)

Other novels

- The Ghost Diviners (1977)
- The Freedom Cage (1980)
- Under Siege (1988)
