= Hopper's Hall =

Building in Datchworth, Hertfordshire, England

Coordinates: 51°50′54″N 0°09′29″W

Hopper's Hall is a grade II listed house in Watton Road, Datchworth, Hertfordshire. It dates from around 1640 with minor additions and alterations since. Hoppers End, Hoppers Barn, and Hoppers Lodge are all adjacent.
