= St Michael and All Angels' Church, Diseworth =

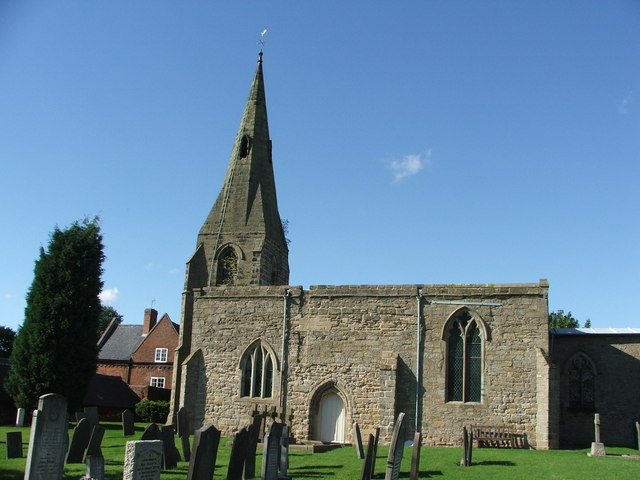
- St Michael and All Angels' Church, Diseworth

- Location within Leicestershire
- 52°48′57″N 1°19′44″W
- OS grid reference: SK 45370 24530
- Location: Diseworth
- Country: England
- Denomination: Church of England

History
- Dedication: Michael (archangel)

Architecture
- Heritage designation: Grade II* listed

Administration
- Diocese: Leicester
- Archdeaconry: Loughborough
- Deanery: Akeley East
- Parish: Diseworth

St Michael and All Angels' Church, Diseworth is a Grade II* listed Church of England church in Kegworth, Leicestershire.

== History ==
The church dates from the 11th century, but the majority of the fabric is from the 13th century with the tower dating from the early 14th century. The north porch is dated 1661. Some restoration work was carried out in 1840 and the church was re-pewed in 1842. The chancel was restored in 1885 and fitted out with oak at a cos of £130.

In 1885 a humorous incident occurred which was recorded in the Coleshill Chronicle of 18 July 1885:

It may be interesting to some of your readers to hear of a humorous incident which occurred on Sunday, the 5th, during morning service at the village church of Diseworth. Owing to the heat both doors of the church were left open, and in the middle of a most touching prayer we were roused by the presence and terrified by the bellowing of a good sized heifer, which had entered the church by the back entrance, and was standing bellowing in the middle of the church. The congregation were in fits of laughter, and the worth vicar himself had difficulty in keeping his gravity. With a little difficulty the clerk persuaded the beast to go out, and again, when we had forgotten the incident, and just as the vicar was ascending the pulpit steps, we heard our noisy friend in the church porch, but it did not get in this time, as the clerk stopped its further progress, and after a good sermon this morning service closed.

The churchyard was extended in 1896 with land given by Charles Shakespear of Langley Priory.

The spire and tower were restored in 1897 at a cost of £160 by W. Mitchell of Leicester and E. Jordan of Diseworth.

The Lychgate in the churchyard was erected in 1897 and paid for by the Misses Shakespear of Langley Priory, and four new windows were restored to commemorate the diamond jubilee of Queen Victoria.

The south aisle roof was renewed in 1902, the nave roof in 1949, and the chancel roof in 1964.

== Memorials ==
- Anne Cheslyn †1823
- John Shakespear †1858 (north wall of Chancel)
- Richard Cheslyn †1843
- Anne Cheslyn †1882 (daughter of Richard)
- Trooper George Harris †1901 (killed in the Transvaal)

== Organ ==
The barrel pipe organ dates from 1824 and was built by Thomas Grey for Revd. G.L. Harvey for £50.

== Bells ==
Early records show that the tower had a ring of four bells, the 1st cast by John Briant, Hertford, & B. Court, Leicester in 1803, the second dating from 1672, the 3rd, and 4th dating from 1626. The tower now contains a ring of 6 bells dating from 1921 cast by John Taylor of Loughborough.

== Clock ==
The tower contains a slate clock face dated 1730. For many years this was served by an older wood-framed clock mechanism of three compartments with anchor escapement and a double right-angled locking piece. This clock mechanism is now in the care of the Leicester Museum.

== Churchyard ==
The churchyard contains memorials to two soldiers from the First World War. Private John Frederick Allcroft of 1st Battalion Leicestershire Regiment who died on 31 May 1915 aged 21, and Private Arthur Chapman of 5th Northern General Hospital division of the Royal Army Medical Corps who died on 23 November 1919 aged 46.
