= Long Whatton =

Village in Leicestershire, England

Coordinates: 52.8057°N 1.2875°W

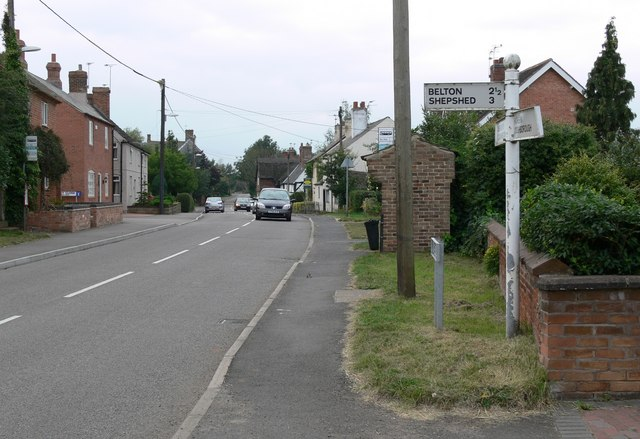
- Looking along West End in Long Whatton

- Location within Leicestershire
- Population: 1,156 (2021)
- OS grid reference: SK478235
- Civil parish: Long Whatton and Diseworth
- District: North West Leicestershire
- Shire county: Leicestershire
- Region: East Midlands
- Country: England
- Sovereign state: United Kingdom
- Post town: LOUGHBOROUGH
- Postcode district: LE12
- Dialling code: 01509
- Police: Leicestershire
- Fire: Leicestershire
- Ambulance: East Midlands
- UK Parliament: North West Leicestershire

Long Whatton is a village and former civil parish, now in the parish of Long Whatton and Diseworth, in the North West Leicestershire district, in the English county of Leicestershire. It is south of East Midlands Airport, off Junctions 23 and 23A of the M1 motorway, and has easy access to Loughborough via the A6 and to Shepshed, Ashby-de-la-Zouch and Kegworth.

== Geography ==
It is near the Charnwood Forest, in the northern division of the county, West Goscote hundred, rural deanery of Akeley, Loughborough Union and County Court district. The village is situated on the south bank of a small rivulet. It is 4.5 mi (7.2 km) north west by west from Loughborough, 16.5 mi (26.6 km) north west from Leicester, 3 mi (4.8 km) south south east. from Castle Donington, and about the same distance from Kegworth.

The population of Long Whatton as of 2021 is 1,156.

Long Whatton History Society is participating in the setting up of a local heritage centre with the Diseworth Heritage Trust.

== Community activities and amenities ==
Long Whatton hosts a village show every August Bank Holiday.

Long Whatton has a Scout troop and a Brownie pack.

Long Whatton has a cricket club and a football team.

Long Whatton has one active church: Long Whatton All Saints Church. http://longwhattonvillage.co.uk/other_pages/all_saints.html

Long Whatton Methodist Church closed its doors in 2020. It had a history of 200 years. http://www.longwhattonvillage.co.uk/other_pages/methodist.html

Long Whatton Baptist Church: Due to a loss of funding, the Baptist Church closed in 2016.

== Civil parish ==
On 1 April 1936 the parish of Diseworth was merged with Long Whatton, parts of Hathern and Shepshed was also merged, on 4 August 1999 the parish was renamed "Long Whatton & Diseworth". In 1931 the parish of Long Whatton (prior to the merge) had a population of 587.

== Gallery ==
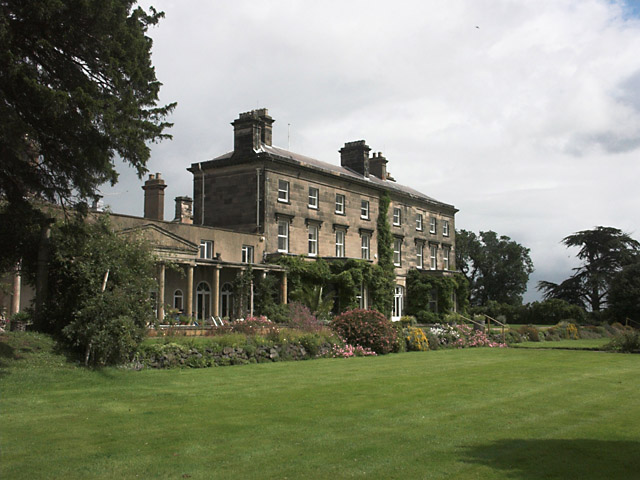
Whatton House

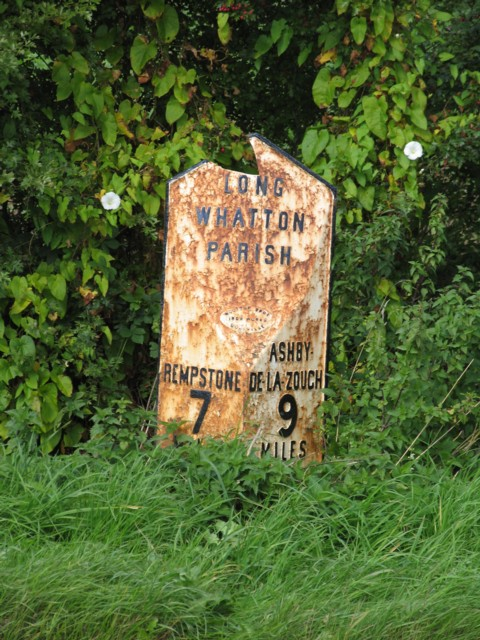
Long Whatton milepost

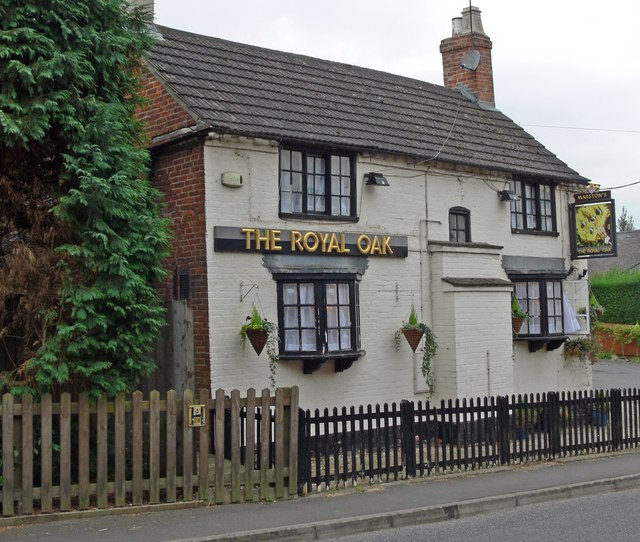
The Royal Oak
