= Diseworth Heritage Centre =

English cultural centre

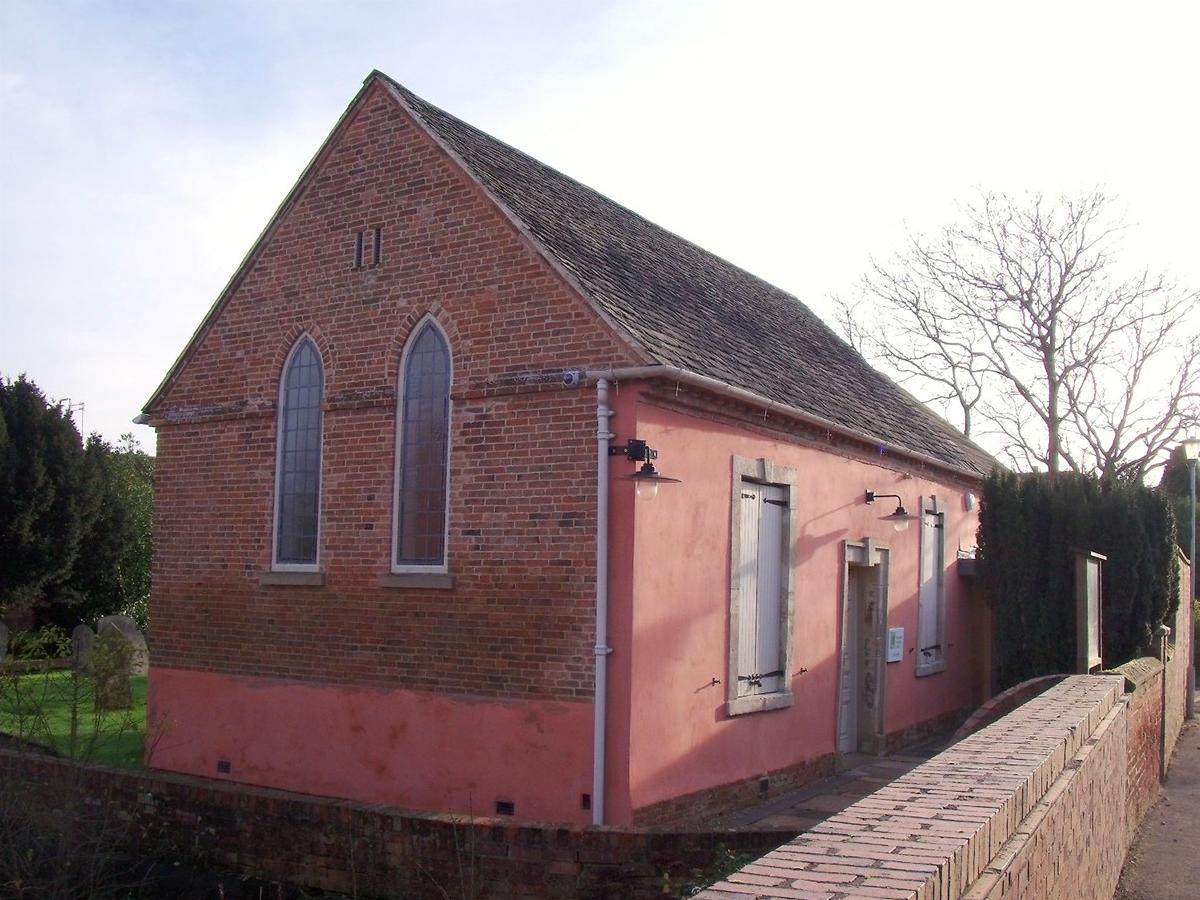

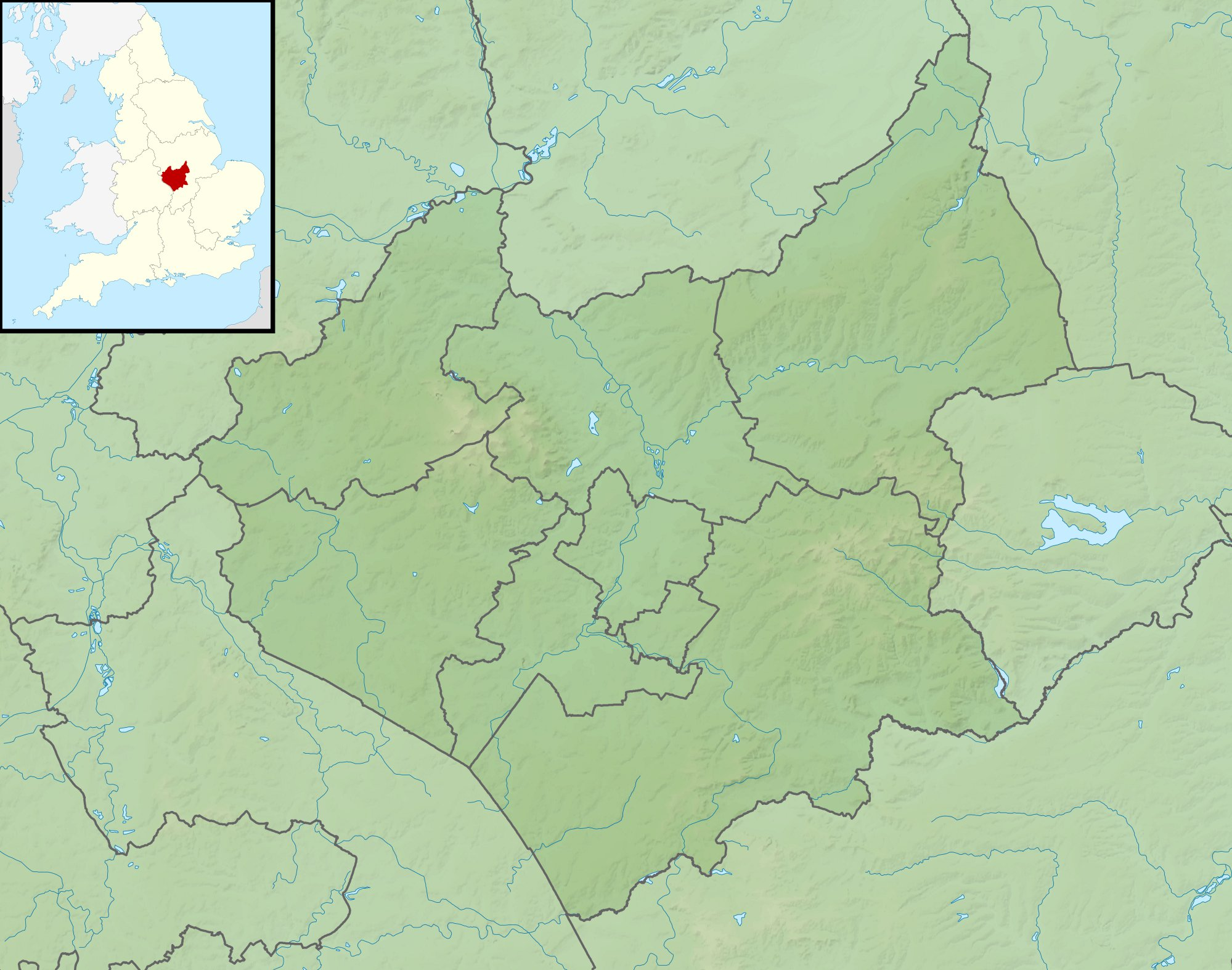
- Location within Leicestershire
- 52.8152°N 1.3289°W
- Type: Redundant chapel
- Location: Diseworth, Leicestershire

History
- Built: 18th century

Site notes
- Governing body: Charitable trust

Listed Building – Grade II
- Official name: Former Baptist chapel
- Designated: 16 January 1989
- Reference no.: 1359389

Diseworth Heritage Centre is a community-based, not-for-profit heritage centre, in the Leicestershire village of Diseworth. The centre is housed in a redundant Baptist chapel building, which was restored by the Diseworth Heritage Trust with funding from the Heritage Lottery Fund and other supporters. The chapel is a Grade II listed building. In 2022 the centre recorded a total of 20 visitors, making it the least-visited tourist attraction in England.

== History ==
The Diseworth Local History Society suggests a date for the establishment of the chapel of 1752, but Historic England's listing record indicates a date of 1773 is more probable. The chapel continued as a place of worship in the Baptist tradition until 2000, but was subject to regular flooding which finally led to its closure. It was then purchased by local enthusiasts and re-opened as a heritage centre in 2009.

In 2022 the centre recorded a total of 20 visitors, making it the least-visited tourist attraction in England. (Note: The equal second-to-lowest places in the VisitEngland 2022 annual survey were shared by the Datchworth Museum in Hertfordshire and the museum of the Huddersfield Astronomical Society in West Yorkshire, each receiving 30 visitors.)

== Architecture and description ==
The chapel was constructed of brick, with a slate roof. It was expanded in 1824 to provide a two-storey school room. The interior is simple, with furnishings from the late 19th and early 20th centuries. The chapel is a Grade II listed building.
