= Long Whatton and Diseworth =

Civil parish in North West Leicestershire, Leicestershire, England

Coordinates: 52.811°N 1.310°W

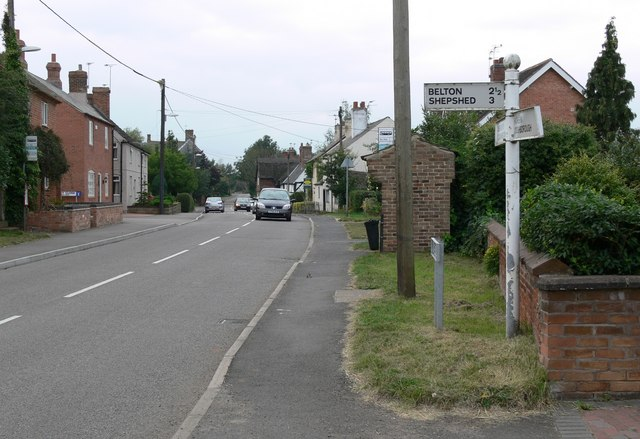
- Long Whatton

- Location within Leicestershire
- Civil parish: Long Whatton and Diseworth
- District: North West Leicestershire
- Shire county: Leicestershire
- Region: East Midlands
- Country: England
- Sovereign state: United Kingdom

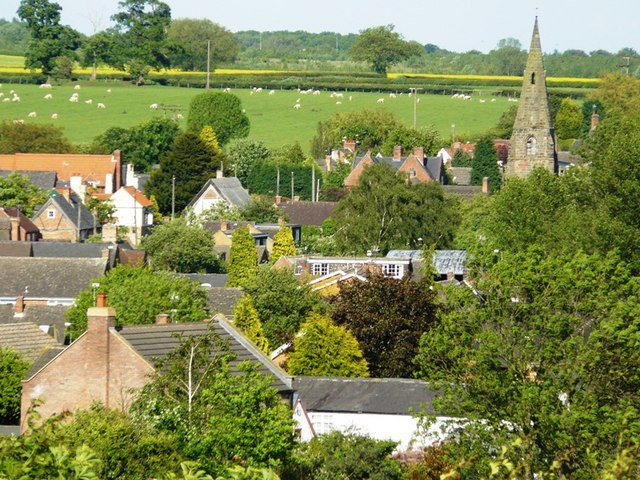
Diseworth

Long Whatton and Diseworth, formerly just Long Whatton is a civil parish in the North West Leicestershire district of Leicestershire, England. The parish includes the villages of Long Whatton and Diseworth. The population of the parish at the 2011 census was 1,760.

The Donington Park motorway service area, a large part of East Midlands Airport, and a smaller part of the East Midlands Gateway freight terminal all lie in the northern part of the civil parish.

== History ==
On 1 April 1936 the parish of Diseworth was merged with Long Whatton, parts of Hathern and Shepshed was also merged, on 4 August 1999 the parish was renamed "Long Whatton & Diseworth".
