= Lindrick =

Ancient district of England

Lindrick was an ancient district of England. The majority of the district appears to have lain in what is now South Yorkshire, but the village of Carlton-in-Lindrick is in Nottinghamshire.

The name of the district is derived from the Old English for "raised, straight strip marked by lime trees".

Lindrick seems to have reached as far as Lindrick Common (which gives its name to Lindrick Golf Club), Lindrick Dale, Laughton Lindrick wood, which lay next to Roche Abbey, and the Lindrick area of Tickhill.
