= Richard Cheslyn =

English cricketer

Personal information
- Born: 17 December 1797; Langley Priory, Leicestershire, England
- Died: 29 December 1858 (aged 61); Newton, Nottinghamshire
- Nickname: 'Captain' Cheslyn
- Bowling: ‘underhand’ (underarm)
- Role: Batsman
- Relatives: William Barber (1st cousin 2× removed); David Barber (1st cousin 4× removed)

Domestic team information
- Years: Team
- 1825-1845: MCC
- 1827: Sussex
- 1846: North

Career statistics
Competition	First-class
Matches	10
Runs scored	116
Batting average	6.82
100s/50s	–/–
Top score	22
Catches/stumpings	–/–
- Source: Cricinfo, 2 October 2026

Richard Cheslyn (1797 – 1858) was an English amateur cricketer who played from 1825 to 1846. He was mainly associated with Sussex and Marylebone Cricket Club (MCC), of which he was a member. He made 10 known appearances in important matches including one for Sussex in the second of the roundarm trial matches in 1827. Although Cheslyn's main concern was maintaining his status and lifestyle, despite his increasing inability to finance either up until 1844,...

Cheslyn was an important actor in the transition from a game dominated by gentlemen whose chief interest was match stakes and gambling to a national pastime imbued by the amateur ideal.

== Early life ==
Cheslyn was born on 17 December 1797 into the "lesser gentry" of Leicestershire. His father, Richard Cheslyn had inherited Langley Priory, an imposing residence and was Sheriff of Leicestershire in 1812. His mother, Anne Barber came from a dynasty of successful Nottinghamshire colliery owners. After being privately educated, Cheslyn attended Christ’s College, Cambridge, graduating in 1821. Owing to his father living beyond his means, the prospect of his inheritance was doubtful when he was 21 and soon would disappear entirely.

== Cricket career ==
Cheslyn first appears in the cricket's records on 10th September 1821 in a game on St Margaret’s Pasture, Leicester, scoring 14 for a Leicester XVI in a victory over a Nottingham XI. He made his first class debut at Lord's 16th June 1825, playing for MCC against Godalming. Forced to seek alternative forms of support to maintain his status as a gentleman, Cheslyn found a partial answer in cricket until the 1850s, for instance playing with I Zingari in 1846. An enthusiastic, but not great, player, he was able, for a period, to finance his participation in the game and maintain his status and lifestyle through organising matches and gambling. When facing failure, a network of influential, Tory-leaning friends, developed from his role in Leicestershire cricket, would come to his rescue. Cheslyn last attended a cricket match in July, 1858 in Leicestershire, five months before his death.

== Work beyond cricket. ==
Having been admitted to Lincoln's Inn in 1820 and then dining at the Inner Temple, Cheslyn was called to the bar in 1825, but he never practised law.

Cheslyn joined the Leicestershire Yeomanry Cavalry in 1824. ln successive years he was promoted to Lieutenant and then Captain. Also in 1826, he purchased a cornetcy in the 7th Queen's Own Hussars. He used the title ‘Captain’ habitually, especially when playing cricket,, even though he was only a cornet in the regular army. As Cheslyn could not afford to buy promotion in the Regular Arm, he sold his commission in March 1828. Having left the Leicestershire Yeomanry, in 1831 he was recruited to the Leicestershire Militia and was promoted to Captain the same year. He seems to have remained attached to the local militia for the next twenty years.

Richard Cheslyn Sr died in January 1843, but his debts would out live his son. Richard Jr had maintained his status as a gentleman "of own means" until, in 1844, the family’s long attachment to the Tory party paid off when Sir Robert Peel appointed him as Distributor of Stamps for Leicestershire, a revenue collector, in charge of administering the stamps on legal documents.

== Personal Life ==
At 52, Richard Cheslyn married Jane Newcomb in Shelford Church, Nottinghamshire in 1849. Jane was 17. The marriage produced two sons and a daughter. However in 1854, Jane died, four months after giving birth to a second son, at Asfordby, Leicestershire. The widower Cheslyn moved in with his father-in-law, John Newcomb at 'Shelford Hills' (now Mill Farm) in Newton, Nottinghamshire. But within a year, the two older children were dead. Cheslyn passed away on 29 December 1858. He left only £300, but his orphaned son, William Hutchinson Cheslyn. would receive assistance with this education from members of the Barber family.

Two distant relations Col William Barber, a first cousin twice removed, and David Barber, a first cousin frice removed, would both play first-class cricket for Nottinghamshire.

== Bibliography ==
- Haygarth, Arthur (1996) [1862]. Scores & Biographies, Volume 1 (1744–1826). Kennington: Frederick Lillywhite. ISBN 978-19-00592-23-9.
- Haygarth, Arthur (1997) [1862]. Scores & Biographies, Volume 2 (1827–1840). Kennington: Frederick Lillywhite. ISBN 978-19-00592-23-9.
