= Isley cum Langley =

Civil parish in Leicestershire, England

Coordinates: 52.816°N 1.356°W

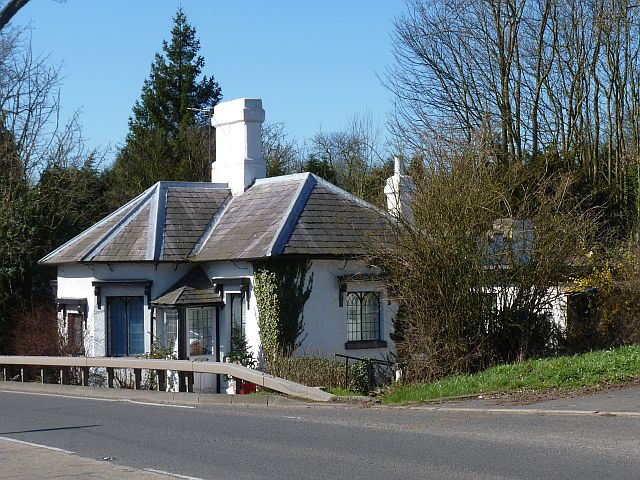
- Former toll house, Isley Walton

- Location within Leicestershire
- Population: 45 (2021 census)
- Civil parish: Isley cum Langley
- District: North West Leicestershire
- Shire county: Leicestershire
- Region: East Midlands
- Country: England
- Sovereign state: United Kingdom
- Police: Leicestershire
- Fire: Leicestershire
- Ambulance: East Midlands

Isley cum Langley is a civil parish in the North West Leicestershire district of Leicestershire, England, lying immediately south-west of East Midlands Airport. According to the 2001 census it had a population of 64. At the 2021 census the population of the civil parish was 45.

The parish extends south as far as the A42 trunk road. The A453, which was the main route between Birmingham and Nottingham until it was superseded by the A42 in the 1990s, runs through the north of the parish. Junction 23A of the M1 motorway, which serves the airport and connects both the A42 and A453 to the motorway, is about 1.5 miles (2.4 km) from the eastern edge of the parish. The Donington Park motorsport venue is a short distance beyond the north of the parish.

The only settlement in the parish is the hamlet of Isley Walton, which has the parish church. Dedicated to All Saints, the church was rebuilt in 1819 and restored in 1897.

Langley Priory, in a rural setting towards the south of the parish, is a Grade II* listed house dating from the late 16th century but much altered, on the site of a 12th-century Benedictine nunnery. The civil parish of Langley Priory was abolished in 1936, when it was abolished together with Isley Walton parish to create Isley cum Langley. Isley Walton parish had been created in 1866, having been previously a chapelry of Kegworth.

In 2024, North West Leicestershire District Council proposed a new settlement called Isley Woodhouse, with around 4,500 homes, covering much of the northern half of the parish; the plans could take 20 years to complete.
