= The Tilbury, Datchworth =

Pub in Datchworth, Hertfordshire, England

Coordinates: 51°50′55″N 0°09′30″W

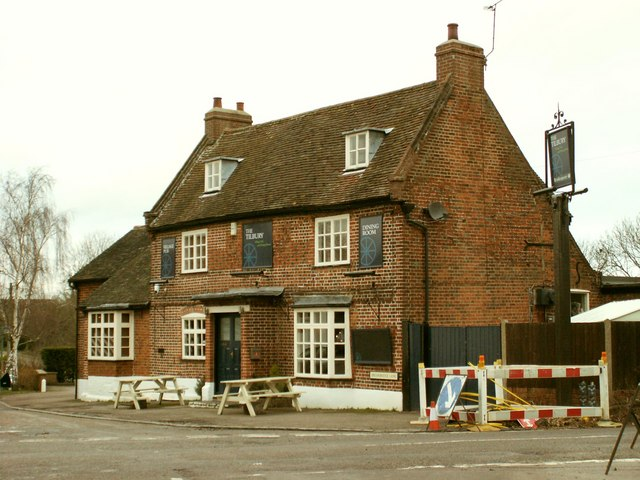
The Tilbury in 2008

The Tilbury is a public house and restaurant in Datchworth, Hertfordshire, England. It was formerly known as The Inn on the Green and The Three Horseshoes.

== Architecture ==
The brick building is Grade II listed and dates from the early eighteenth century with later additions.
