= John Shakespear =

British orientalist

John Shakespear (August 1774 – 1858) was an orientalist and professor of Hindustani.

John Shakespear was born in Lount, Leicestershire, in August 1774, the son of a poor farmer. He was educated at the parish school at Staunton Harold and then at a school kept by a clergyman, who brought him to the notice of Francis Rawdon-Hastings. Lord Rawdon sent young Shakespeare to London to study Arabic under John Richardson. From 1805 to 1809 Shakespear held an orientalist professorship at the Royal Military College, Marlow. In 1809 he was appointed professor of Hindustani at Addiscombe Military Seminary and held the professorship until his retirement in 1829 with a pension of £300 per annum.

Shakespear's A Hindustani Grammar (1813) was published as a condensed grammar to replace John B. Gilchrist's A Grammar of Hindoostanee Language (1796), which had gone out of print.

In retirement he bought Langley Priory in Leicestershire. Believing that he might be descended from a branch of William Shakespeare's family, John Shakespear in 1856 gave £2,500 to the trustees of the fund for preserving Shakespeare's Birthplace at Stratford-upon-Avon. He died unmarried in 1858 and his estate was inherited by his nephew, Charles Bowles, who took the surname Shakespear. His memorial is on the north wall of the chancel at St Michael and All Angels' Church, Diseworth.

In 1835 H. P. Briggs painted Shakespear's portrait, which was at Langley Priory for many years.

== Selected publications ==
- Hindustani Grammar, 1813; 4th edition, 1843; 6th edition, 1855.
- Dictionary of Hindustani and English, 1817; 3rd edition, 1834; to the fourth edition of 1849 was added an English-Hindustani Dictionary.
- Muntakhabat-i-Hindi, Selections in Hindustani, 1817–18.
- Introduction to the Hindustani Language, 1845.
