= Carlton in Lindrick =

Village in north Nottinghamshire, England

Coordinates: 53.36°N 1.12°W

- Village and civil parish
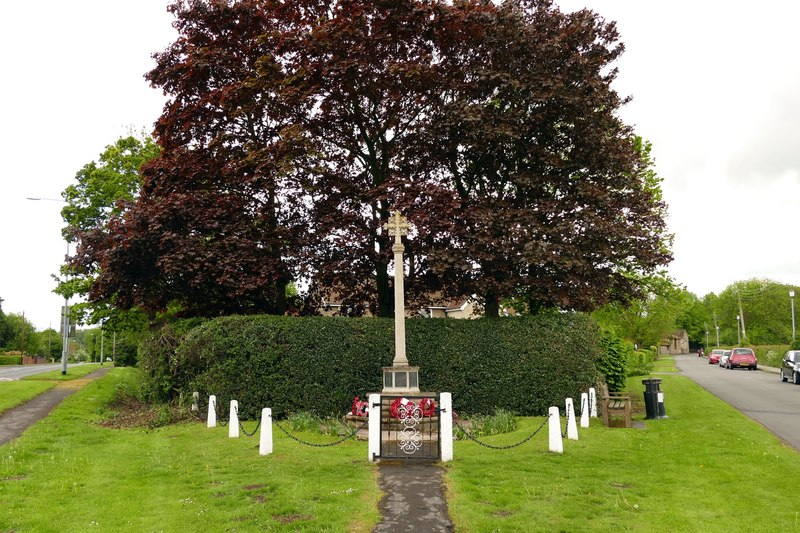
- War Memorial

- Location within Nottinghamshire
- Interactive map of Carlton in Lindrick
- Area: 6.47 sq mi (16.8 km^{2})
- Population: 5,635 (2021)
  - Density: 871/sq mi (336/km^{2})
- OS grid reference: SK 5885
  - London: 135 mi (217 km) SE
- District: Bassetlaw
- Shire county: Nottinghamshire
- Region: East Midlands
- Country: England
- Sovereign state: United Kingdom
- Settlements: Carlton-in-Lindrick; Costhorpe; Wigthorpe
- Post town: Worksop
- Postcode district: S81
- Dialling code: 01909
- Police: Nottinghamshire
- Fire: Nottinghamshire
- Ambulance: East Midlands
- UK Parliament: Bassetlaw
- Website: www.carlton-in-lindrickparishcouncil.org

Carlton in Lindrick is a village and civil parish about 3 miles (5 km) north of Worksop in Nottinghamshire, England. The village comprises three community areas; North Carlton to the centre, South Carlton and Costhorpe to the far north. Separated to the south but within the parish is Wigthorpe, a hamlet. The 2011 Census recorded a parish population of 5,623, including nearby Wallingwells. The 2021 Census reported alone on Carlton in Lindrick parish, with 5,635 residents.

== Toponymy ==
"Carlton", a common English place name, derives from the Old English for "kings' town" or "freemen's town". "Lindrick", denoting the land of the linden or lime tree is the name of the ancient district, most of which is now in South Yorkshire.

== History ==
=== Wallingwells Priory ===
In the reign of King Stephen (1135–41) a Norman landholder, Ralph de Chevrolcourt (or Caprecuria) founded and endowed a Benedictine priory of nuns in Carlton Park. It seems to have been built in 1140–1144. The priory was next to a spring ("juxta fontes et rivum fontium") called Wallingwells and dedicated to St Mary the Virgin. Formally it was called St Mary in the Park, but it was generally known as the Priory of Wallingwells.

By 1262 the priory had certain rights in Carlton's parish church of St John the Evangelist, and also the parish churches of St Wilfrid's Church, Cantley, South Yorkshire and All Saints, Mattersey. The nuns were very poor when Godfrey Ludham, Archbishop of York, granted the priory 18 bovates of land in Carlton parish, and remained poor, so that in 1273 St Wilfrid's Cantley and its tithe income were appropriated as well. Archbishop Godfrey's successor, Walter Giffard, assented to the grant and commended the devoutness of the nuns. A Taxation Roll of 1291 records the Priory as holding temporalities at "Handsworth Woodhouses".

Henry VIII's Valor Ecclesiasticus of 1535 records the priory as holding not only its rectories of Carlton and Cantley and land at Handsworth, but lands at Gildingwells, Gringley and "Willourne". In 1536 the King's agents, Thomas Legh and Richard Layton, visited the priory and found no slander or scandal to report against it. It was a small religious house and so was to have been dissolved under the Suppression of Religious Houses Act 1535, Parliament's first act for the Dissolution of the Monasteries. However, the prioress, Margaret Goldsmith, bought off the Crown officials with a payment equal to the priory's income for more than a year.

In June 1537 Goldsmith demised the priory and its estates to a Richard Oglethorp for 21 years, retaining only the priory church and buildings for the nuns to use. Two years later Parliament passed the Suppression of Religious Houses Act 1539. In December of that year the Wallingwells Priory surrendered to the Crown, which pensioned off the prioress, her sub-prioress and seven other nuns. No visible remains of the priory survive.

The Carlton-in-Lindrick knight is a 12th-century, mounted bronze figurine 6 cm high discovered in 2004 and now displayed in the Bassetlaw Museum, Retford.

== Geography ==
=== Location ===
Carlton in Lindrick is surrounded by the following local locations:

- Blyth and Langold to the north
- Worksop to the south
- Hodsock and Ranby to the east
- Wallingwells and Woodsetts to the west.

It is 6.48 square miles (16.8 km^{2}) in area, 3.4 miles (5.5 km) in height and in width, resting alongside the western boundary of Bassetlaw district and on the Nottinghamshire northwestern boundary with South Yorkshire. The parish is roughly bounded by land features such as Langold Lake to the north, Wallingwells Hall to the west, Hodsock Priory to the east, and Gateford Hill to the south.

=== Settlements and routes ===
There is the core village of Carlton in Lindrick to the north of the parish. The village comprises Costhorpe to the far north, North Carlton is central, with South Carlton adjacent. Wigthorpe is a hamlet separated from the village to the south but central to the parish. Carlton Forest is a small industrialised area to the southeast. Carlton in Lindrick and Wigthorpe lay along the A60 Worksop-Tickhill road, and Carlton Forest is on the B6045 Worksop-Blyth route. Outside of these locations, the parish is predominantly an agricultural and rural area.

=== Environment ===
==== Landscape ====
Primarily farming and pasture land throughout the parish outside the populated areas, there is some forestry throughout, mainly woods north of Costhorpe, south of Carlton village and east of Carlton Forest.

==== Geology ====
To the west is a mix of the Edlington Formation mudstones which is sedimentary bedrock from between 272.3 and 252.2 million years ago within the Permian period, and Brotherton Formation limestones of sedimentary bedrock formed during the same era. Central and to the south is a combination of the Chester Formation sandstones, made up of pebbly sedimentary bedrock from 250–247.1 million years ago during the Triassic period and Lenton Sandstone Formation bedrock created between 272.3 and 247.1 million years ago within the Permian and Triassic periods.

Water features

Langold Lake lies on the northernmost edge of the parish, Carlton Lake is to the west of South Carlton. There is a small pond in North Carlton close to a recreational ground.

==== Land elevation ====
The parish is lowest to the east and north east near to Costhorpe and North Carlton from 20 metres (66 ft), rising towards the settlements and north, west and south. Carlton village ranges from 21–39 metres (69–128 ft) and Wigthorpe is 35 metres (115 ft). The highest natural point is a section by the southern boundary by Peak and Gateford hills, at 70–72 metres (230–236 ft). The overall highest feature is a spoil heap close to Costhorpe and Langold Lake in Langold Country Park at 81 metres (266 ft).

== Religion ==
St John the Evangelist's Church is an 11th-century late Saxon building with Norman, 15th-century Perpendicular Gothic and 19th-century Gothic Revival additions. St John's is the most important surviving Saxon or Saxon-Norman building in Nottinghamshire and a Grade I listed building. There is a service every Sunday morning at 10.30.

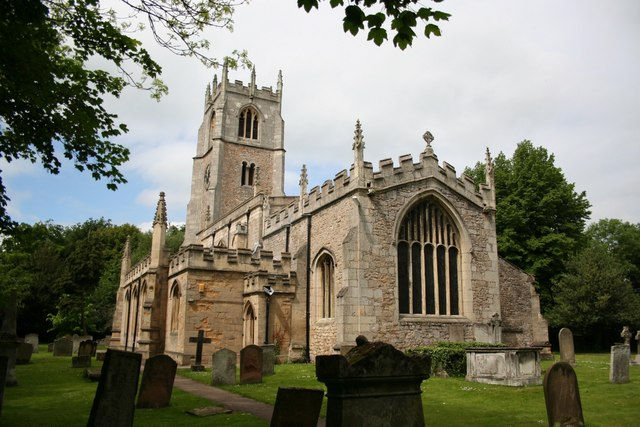
St Johns Church

The Wesleyan chapel built in Carlton in 1861 now serves Carlton Methodist Church, as part of the Trinity Methodist Circuit. A service is held every Sunday at 10.45 am.

== Notable people ==
- David Barber (born 1937), cricketer
- Mary Melwood (1912–2002), children's writer
- Kathleen Scott, Baroness Kennet, English sculptor (born Kathleen Bruce, 1878–1947), was born in Carlton as the youngest child of the Anglican rector. She married Captain Robert Falcon Scott, Antarctic explorer, and was mother to the artist, ornithologist and painter Peter Scott. Her son by her second husband, politician and writer Hilton Young, 1st Baron Kennet, was Wayland Young, 2nd Baron Kennet, also a politician and writer.

== Amenities ==
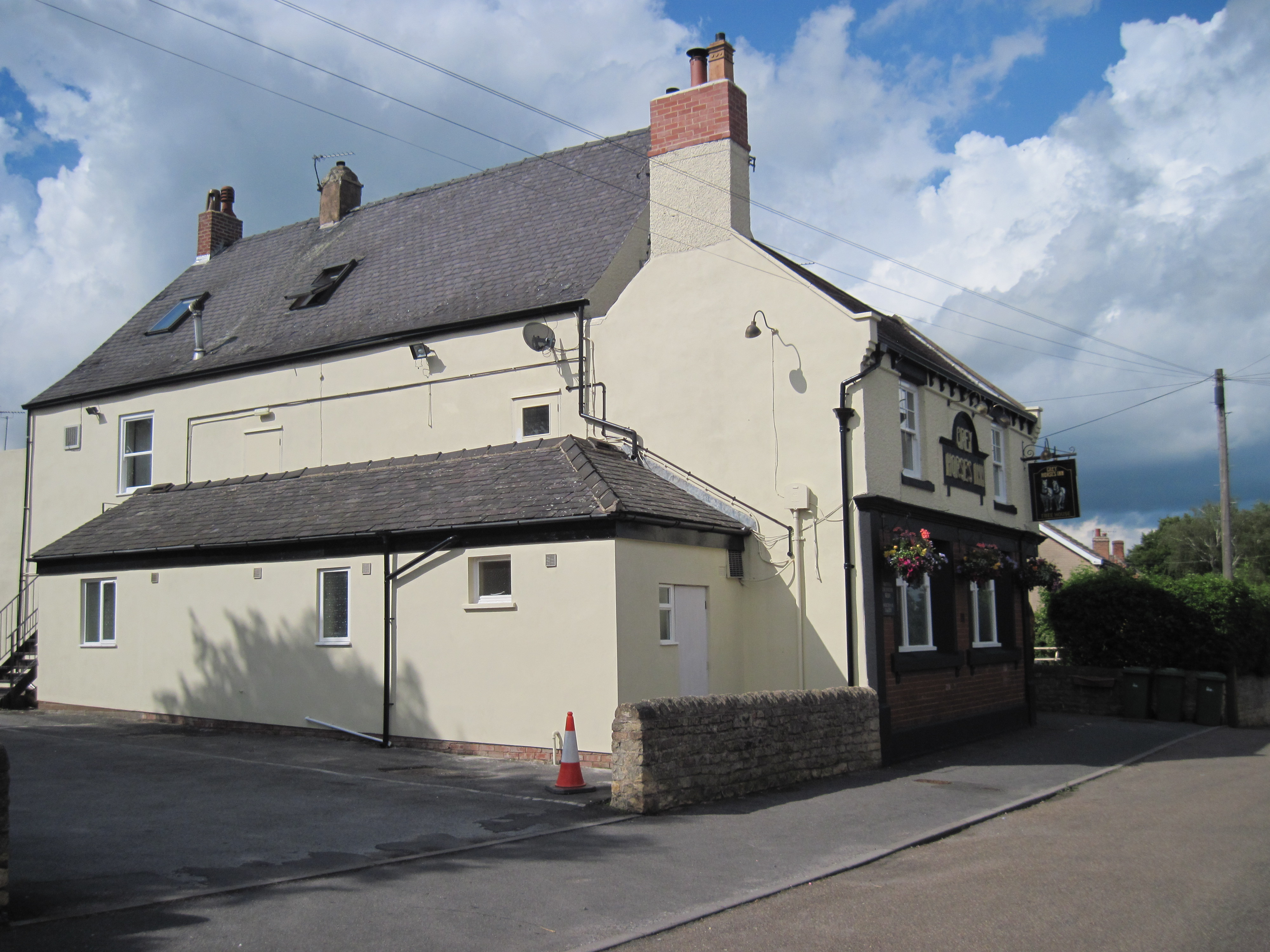
Grey Horses Inn

Carlton has a civic centre. There is also a public library in Long Lane, which currently opens on Monday afternoons and Friday mornings.

There is a doctors' surgery in Long Lane.

Carlton Mill is a privately owned 19th-century corn mill, water-powered with an auxiliary steam engine. It is now operated only at annual flower shows.

=== Public transport ===
Carlton is served by the 22 bus route between Worksop and Doncaster. It runs half-hourly on Mondays to Saturdays and hourly on Sundays. The nearest railway station is Shireoaks (4 miles/6.4 km) on the Sheffield–Lincoln line, which offers an hourly service on Mondays to Saturdays and a two-hourly service on Sunday afternoons.

== See also ==
- Listed buildings in Carlton in Lindrick

== Bibliography ==
- Hey, David (2003). Medieval South Yorkshire. Landmark Collector's Library. Ashbourne: Landmark Publishing Ltd. ISBN 1843060809.
- Page, W.H., ed. (1910). A History of the County of Nottinghamshire. Victoria County History. Vol. 2. pp. 89–90.
- Pevsner, Nikolaus; Williamson, Elizabeth (revision) (1979) [1951]. Nottinghamshire. The Buildings of England (2nd ed.). Harmondsworth: Penguin Books. pp. 92–93, 363. ISBN 0-14-071002-7.
