= William Barber (Nottinghamshire cricketer) =

English cricketer

William Douglas Barber (17 October 1881 – 26 April 1971) was an English cricketer. He was a right-handed batsman and wicket-keeper who played for Nottinghamshire. He was born in Eastwood and died at Ranby Hall, Nottinghamshire.

Barber was commissioned a second lieutenant in the 1st Battalion, King's Royal Rifle Corps on 4 May 1901. He served with the battalion in South Africa during the later part of the Second Boer War. Following the end of the war, he left South Africa in September 1902 with other men of his regiment on the SS Sardinia, which took them to a new posting at Malta. He was awarded the Military Cross in 1915, was promoted to Colonel in 1923 and retired from the army in 1937.

Barber's first-class debut came in 1904, against Lancashire. Barber scored 7 runs in the only innings in which he batted in the match.

Twenty years after his sole County Championship appearance, Barber played for the Army cricket team against Oxford University. The game finished in an innings defeat for the Army team.

His first cousin twice removed, Richard Cheslyn, and great-nephew, David Barber, were also first-class cricketers.
