= Costhorpe =

Hamlet in Nottinghamshire, England

Coordinates: 53.365°N 1.120°W

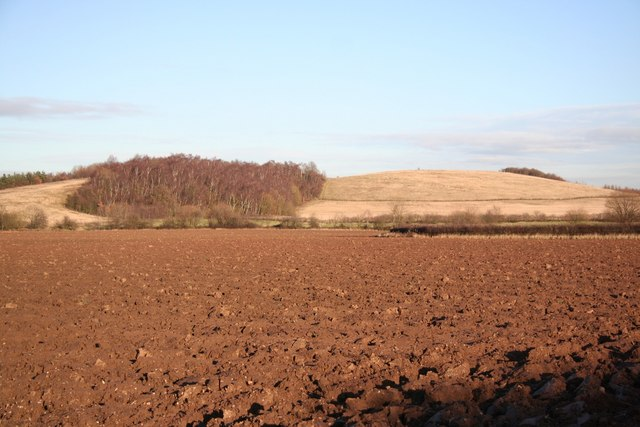
- Farmland in Costhorpe

- Location within Nottinghamshire
- Civil parish: Carlton in Lindrick
- District: Bassetlaw
- Shire county: Nottinghamshire
- Region: East Midlands
- Country: England
- Sovereign state: United Kingdom
- Post town: Worksop
- Postcode district: S81
- Dialling code: 01909
- Police: Nottinghamshire
- Fire: Nottinghamshire
- Ambulance: East Midlands
- UK Parliament: Bassetlaw

Costhorpe is a hamlet in the civil parish of Carlton in Lindrick, in the Bassetlaw district in Nottinghamshire, England. It is to the north of Worksop.
