= Wigthorpe =

Hamlet in Nottinghamshire, England

Coordinates: 53.342°N 1.113°W

- Hamlet
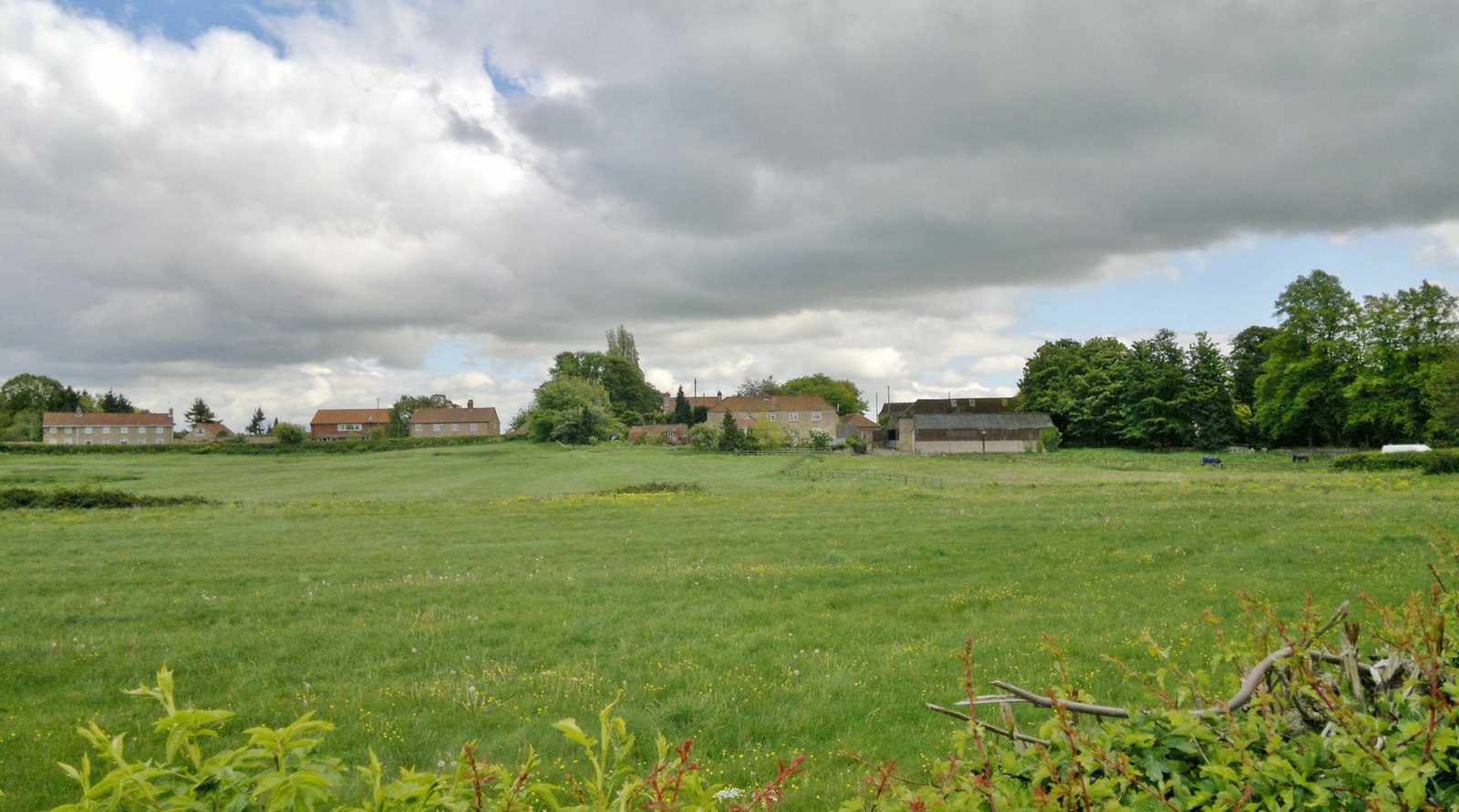

- Location within Nottinghamshire
- Civil parish: Carlton in Lindrick
- Shire county: Nottinghamshire
- Region: East Midlands
- Country: England
- Sovereign state: United Kingdom
- Post town: Worksop
- Postcode district: S81
- Dialling code: 01909
- Police: Nottinghamshire
- Fire: Nottinghamshire
- Ambulance: East Midlands
- UK Parliament: Bassetlaw

Wigthorpe is a hamlet in the civil parish of Carlton in Lindrick, in the Bassetlaw district lying to the north of Worksop, England.
