= Mary Melwood =

British author and playwright

Mary Melwood, a pen name of Eileen Mary Lewis (née Eileen Hall), was an English playwright and author who wrote primarily for children during the 1960s to 1980s. The Nottinghamshire countryside is a key theme in her writing, which draws particular inspiration from the River Trent and Sherwood Forest.

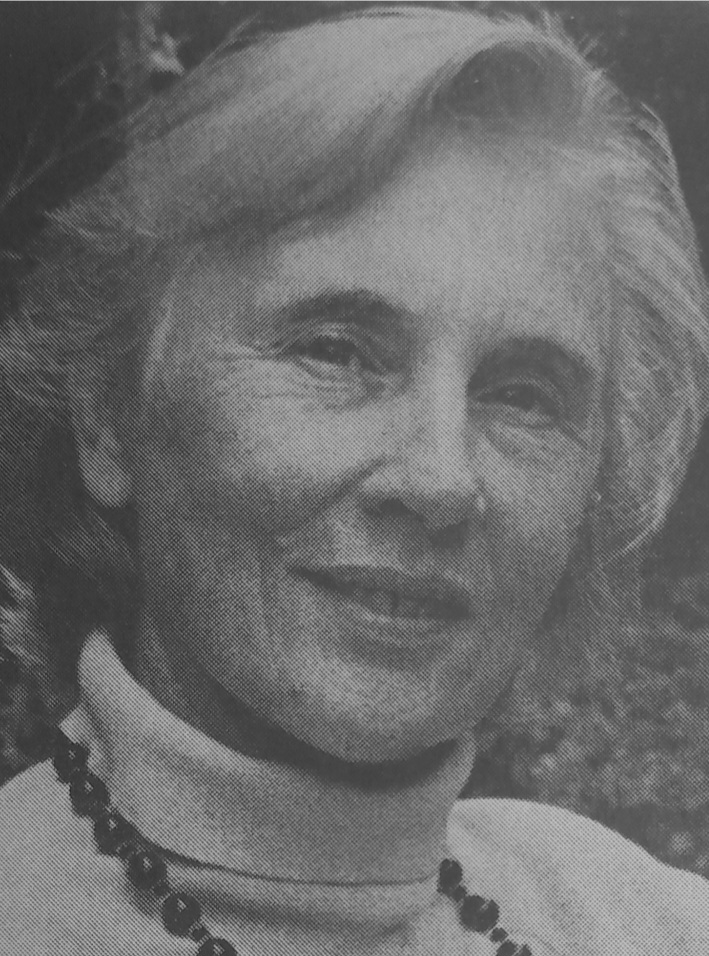
Playwright and author Mary Melwood

== Plays ==
Mary Melwood wrote four children’s plays: The Tingalary Bird (1964), Five Minutes to Morning (1965), Masquerade (1974), and The Small Blue Hoping Stone (1976).

The Tingalary Bird won the first British Arts Council Award for Children’s Theatre, and was first performed with the Unicorn Theatre for Young People at the Arts Theatre in London on 21 December 1964. It is an absurdist piece with three main characters: an Old Man and Old Woman in their ramshackle cottage, and a caged Bird left on their doorstep. The Bird’s eyes light with different colours and its tail changes from black to colourful. The play is in three short acts with songs and pieces of audience interaction interspersed throughout. It was first published in the New Plays for Children series, and was included in the anthology in All the World’s a Stage: Modern Plays for Young People, ed. Lowell Swortzell.

Melwood’s second play Five Minutes to Morning was also granted an Arts Council Award, and it was included in the anthology Contemporary Children’s Theater, ed. Betty Jean Lifton. Both The Tingalary Bird and Five Minutes to Morning were performed multiple times throughout the USA, Canada, Australia and the UK.

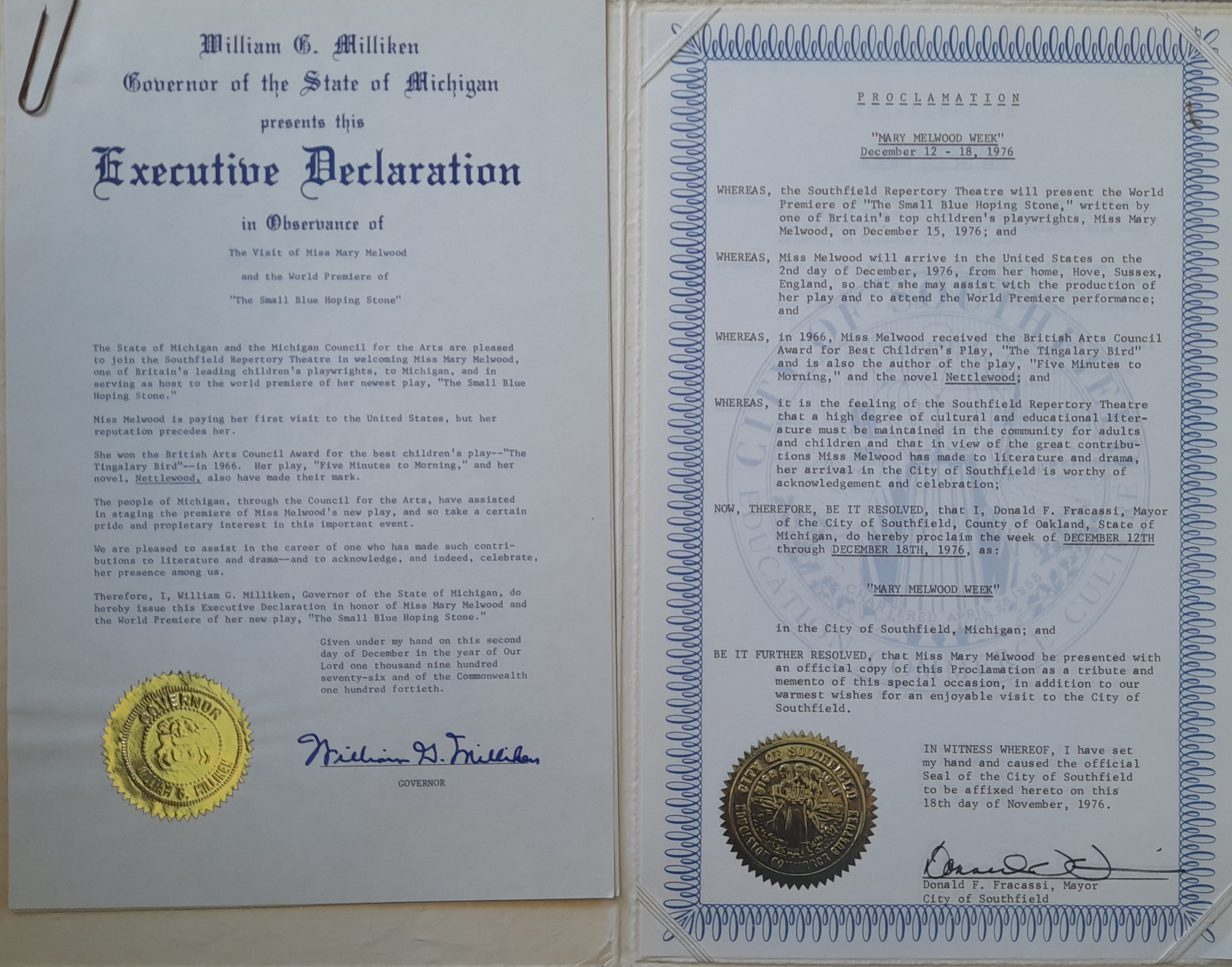
Certificates dated 2 December 1967 from William G. Milliken, Governor of the State of Michigan, and 18 November 1976 from Donald F. Fracassi, Mayor of Southfield, declaring 12–18 December 1976 "Mary Melwood Week".

Masquerade was first performed by the Nottingham Playhouse Company in 1970 and is a reimagining of Chaucerian fables for children, set on a farm and featuring music, dancing and audience participation. The Small Blue Hoping Stone is a Christmas drama about a struggling young couple who find meaning in a pebble on the beach. It was first performed by the Southfield Repertory Theatre in Southfield, Michigan, in December 1976. Melwood was flown over so that she could see the performance and she was given a warm welcome, with the city’s mayor presenting her with a certificate that proclaimed 12–18 December 1976 "Mary Melwood Week".

Melwood also wrote Mixie, a one-act play exploring darker themes. It was first performed at the New Venture Theatre in Brighton and Hove in November 2024, directed by Rod Lewis. Mr and Mrs Bick spend their days in a cluttered room, arguing about a range of things including the potentially mythical figure of Mixie. The play raises questions about relationships, co-dependency and dementia, leaving the audience to interpret what is and isn't real.

== Novels ==
Melwood’s first novel Nettlewood was published by André Deutsch in 1974 and Seabury Press in 1975. It is set just after the First World War in Owsterley, a fictional village by the River Trent. The main character is a 12-year-old girl, Lacie Lindrick. When her father falls ill and her mother is sent to care for him, Lacie is shunted between her two adult cousins Chloe and Nora, who have little time for her. However, Lacie soon befriends Gertie Sprott and Poor Tom. Together, they explore the secrets of Nettlewood and the surrounding countryside.

The Watcher Bee, published by André Deutsch in 1982 and reprinted by Scholastic Publications Ltd in 1995, is a coming-of-age novel told from a first-person perspective. Kate, the Watcher Bee, is growing up in a small village in the Midlands in the interwar years. Orphaned soon after her birth, with both parents dying in 1919 during the Spanish flu pandemic, she is raised by her Granny, Uncle Ben and Aunt Beth. Kate is clever and resourceful but feels like an outsider, with love affairs largely confined to her own imagination. She is a teenager torn between exhilaration, boredom and fear in a world about to change as WWII looms on the horizon. The Watcher Bee won the Young Observer Fiction Prize in November 1982.

Reflections in Black Glass was published by André Deutsch in 1987 and Headline Book Publishing in 1988. It is a third-person narrative set in Nottinghamshire in the interwar years. Practical-minded Bella Dashby marries Cyrus Millander, who owns Painsmort together with his brother Archie. Archie prizes his family and the scrap of marshland known as Black Glass above everything else in the world. When Archie’s farm fails, his family are forced to move to Morthill, with Bella and Cyrus taking control of the land. The novel charts the inner lives of the family members in both households as they navigate through challenging times.

== TV and radio ==
In her early years of writing, Melwood submitted several radio and TV plays to the BBC under her maiden name of Eileen Hall. Her play It Isn’t Enough was originally broadcast in the Midland Home Service in 1957 before being filmed for television as part of the Saturday Playhouse series, broadcast on 26 September 1959.

== Personal life ==
Mary Melwood was the pen name of Eileen Mary Lewis, née Hall. She was born on 14 April 1912 and grew up in the village of Carlton in Lindrick, Nottinghamshire, England. She married Morris Lewis in 1940 and they had two sons, Bob and Rod. Mary and Morris spent their final years in Brighton, where Morris painstakingly typed up her final novel Plainstones. She died in March 2002 at the age of 89.
