= Isley Woodhouse =

Planned community in Leicestershire, England

Coordinates: 52.816°N 1.354°W

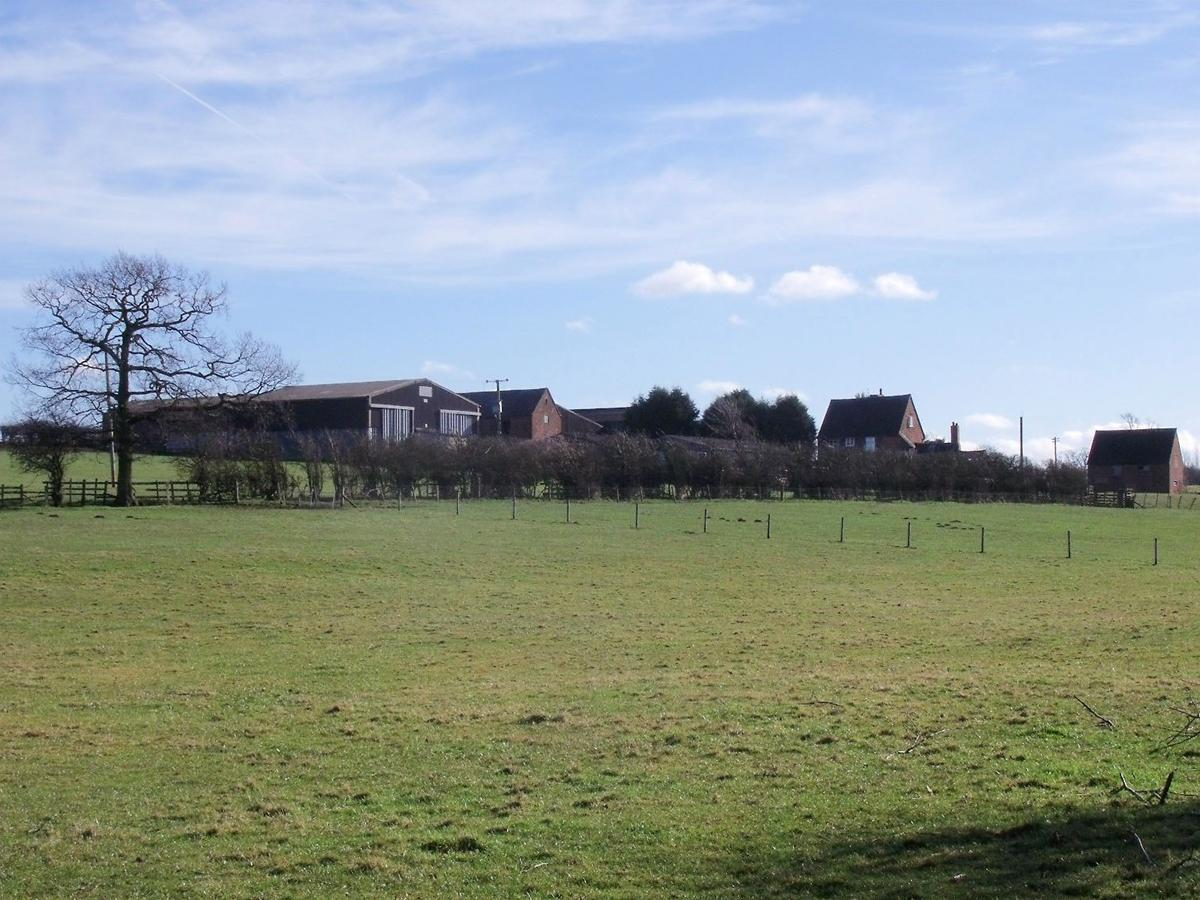
Woodhouse Farm occupies part of the proposed area of the development.

Isley Woodhouse is a planned community in Leicestershire, England, in Isley cum Langley parish, close to East Midlands Airport.

== History ==
In 2022, North West Leicestershire District Council put forward plans for a new settlement with around 4,700 homes and a primary school, on land to the south-west of East Midlands Airport. The proposals were included in a public consultation for a Local Plan review in February and March 2024. Consultation documents stated that the 781-acre (316 ha) site had potential for 4,500 homes, and that the development could take more than 20 years to complete, with up to 1,900 homes built by 2040.

The development is a response to population growth; the district council predicted that creation of 686 new homes per year would be required across its area between 2024 and 2040.
