= David Barber (cricketer) =

English cricketer (born 1938)

Personal information
- Full name: Thomas David Barber
- Born: 18 November 1937 (age 88); Carlton in Lindrick, Nottinghamshire, England
- Batting: Right-handed
- Bowling: Right-arm off break
- Relatives: William Barber (great-uncle); Richard Cheslyn (cousin 4× removed)

Domestic team information
- Years: Team
- 1960: Nottinghamshire

Career statistics
Competition	First-class
Matches	2
Runs scored	5
Batting average	2.50
100s/50s	–/–
Top score	3
Balls bowled	–
Wickets	–
Bowling average	–
5 wickets in innings	–
10 wickets in match	–
Best bowling	–
Catches/stumpings	2/–
- Source: Cricinfo, 8 March 2013

Sir Thomas David Barber, 3rd Baronet Barber of Greasley (born 18 November 1937) is an English former cricketer. Barber was a right-handed batsman who bowled right-arm off break. He was born at Carlton in Lindrick, Nottinghamshire.

Barber made a single first-class appearance for Nottinghamshire against Cambridge University in 1960 at Fenner's. Barber made scores of 3 in Nottinghamshire's first-innings before he was dismissed by Alan Hurd, while in their second-innings he was dismissed for a duck by David Kirby. His only first-class appearance for Nottinghamshire ended in a 161 runs defeat. Just after a month later he made a further appearance in first-class cricket, this time for the Free Foresters against Cambridge University at Fenner's. He ended the Free Foresters first-innings not out on 2, while he wasn't required to bat in their second-innings, with the Free Foresters winnings by 5 wickets.

His great-uncle, William Barber, and first cousin frice removed, Richard Cheslyn, were also first-class cricketers.
