= Saturday Playhouse =

British TV drama series (1958–1961)

Saturday Playhouse is a sixty-minute British anthology television series produced by and airing on the British Broadcasting Corporation (BBC) from 4 January 1958 until 1 April 1961. There were sixty-eight episodes, among them adaptations of the plays The Man Who Came to Dinner and The Cat and the Canary. One of the episodes, Alex Atkinson’s classic thriller Design for Murder, was featured twice on the BBC: first on Saturday Playhouse (Saturday, 15 March 1958; S1/Ep.6) and again from the BBC's own theatre in Bristol (Thursday, 6 July 1961).

Many actors performed for Saturday Playhouse, including: Maxine Audley, John Barrie, Michael Bates, Brian Blessed, Jeremy Brett, Michael Crawford, Anton Diffring, Paul Eddington, Denholm Elliott, Thora Hird, Desmond Llewelyn, Margaret Lockwood, Leo McKern, Bob Monkhouse, Leslie Phillips, Prunella Scales and Elizabeth Shepherd, among others. Screenplays were written by a range of established and new writers, including Patrick Hamilton, Lynn Foster, Alun Richards and Mary Melwood.

Only a single episode is believed to have survived.
