= Diseworth =

Village in Leicestershire, England

Coordinates: 52.81527°N 1.33377°W

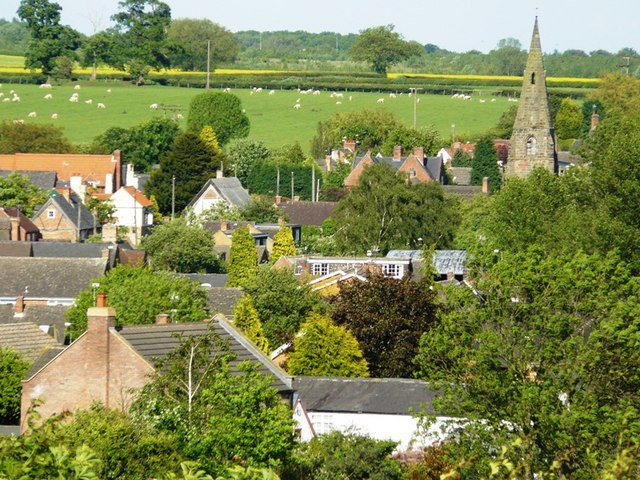

- Location within Leicestershire
- Civil parish: Long Whatton and Diseworth
- District: North West Leicestershire
- Shire county: Leicestershire
- Region: East Midlands
- Country: England
- Sovereign state: United Kingdom
- Post town: DERBY
- Postcode district: DE74
- Dialling code: 01332
- Police: Leicestershire
- Fire: Leicestershire
- Ambulance: East Midlands
- UK Parliament: North West Leicestershire
- Website: Diseworth.uk

Diseworth is a village and former civil parish, now in the parish of Long Whatton and Diseworth, in the North West Leicestershire district, in the English county of Leicestershire. It is south of East Midlands Airport and off Junction 23A of the M1 motorway.

A village of some 670 residents, it is located 14 km to the north-west of Loughborough and 2.5 km to the south-east of Castle Donington. The settlement is in the civil parish of Long Whatton and Diseworth, and lies within an undulating agricultural landscape and occupies a shallow valley created by the Diseworth Brook as it flows eastwards before becoming Long Whatton Brook and proceeding to its confluence with the River Soar.

The four principal streets of the village - Grimes Gate, Hall Gate, Clements Gate and Lady Gate - meet at The Cross; a staggered crossroads close to the Church of St Michael's and All Angels. Page Lane runs parallel to Lady Gate. The Green running along the southern edge of the settlement gives access into Hall Gate - via The Bowley -and into Lady Gate. Diseworth Brook flows to the south of Hall Gate and is joined by tributaries to the east of Shakespear Close and near Town End.

The famous astrologer and occultist, William Lilly was born in Diseworth on 1 May 1602.

== Diseworth Heritage Trust ==
The Diseworth Heritage Trust is a charitable trust, registered in the UK (No. 1112223) that is dedicated to preserving the historical and architectural heritage of the village of Diseworth in Leicestershire, England, and its surrounding area, from its earliest origins to the present. The Trust was responsible for the restoration of the redundant Baptist Chapel building in Diseworth (originally built in 1752, and therefore one of the oldest in the county), as a local Heritage centre, which will provide a variety of facilities for education and entertainment. This was made possible by sponsorship from local and national organisations, including the Heritage Lottery Fund. The Trust welcomes members with a general interest in local history, as well as those directly associated with the village. The Trust works closely with the Diseworth and Long Whatton History Societies, and other organisations to develop interest in local history.

== Diseworth's history ==
The village's name means 'farm/settlement of Digoth'.

Archaeological evidence shows that the site of Diseworth was inhabited in the Roman, Saxon and Viking periods. Its position in a sheltered valley next to the brook is a classic setting for early settlement, and the development of farmsteads. Diseworth has had many variations on its name, but almost always with the suffix 'worth', meaning enclosed settlement.

At the time of the Norman conquest, Diseworth was sufficiently important to be part of an award to a Norman knight, and appear in the Domesday book. William Lovett held some 360 acres in Diseworth, although his tenure did not last for long.

By the early 12th century, land around Diseworth was held by the Earls of Leicester and Chester, and by Robert de Ferrers. Many disputes over the ownership of the land followed in the period up to the late 15th century, when in 1487 the estate was declared the property of Sir Henry Colet.

The nearby Langley Priory had exercised considerable control over the parish church and the villagers, many of whom worked for the nuns. Benefactors who donated land to the Priory often chose land in Diseworth. Shortly before the dissolution of the Priory, along with other religious properties and land in England, Margaret Beaufort, mother of Henry VII, purchased a considerable part of the village to found what became Christ's College, Cambridge.

For the next five hundred years, Diseworth was dominated by the owners of Langley Priory estate and Christ's College, and saw the villagers paying rent to either the Reverend Gentlemen of Christ's, or the new owners of Langley: first the Grays, then the Cheslyns and then the Shakepears. The college sold their interest in Diseworth in 1920, but there remain a few farms and houses still owned by landlords.

In 1931, the parish had a population of 345. On 1 April 1936, the parish was abolished and merged with Long Whatton.

Today, Diseworth is still notable for having several active farms contained within the village itself, although its proximity to East Midlands Airport has very recently placed it under threat from industrial development that threatens the very character and setting of the village.

== Notable people ==
- William Lilly, astrologer
