= St Andrew's Church, Kegworth =

St Andrew’s Church, Kegworth
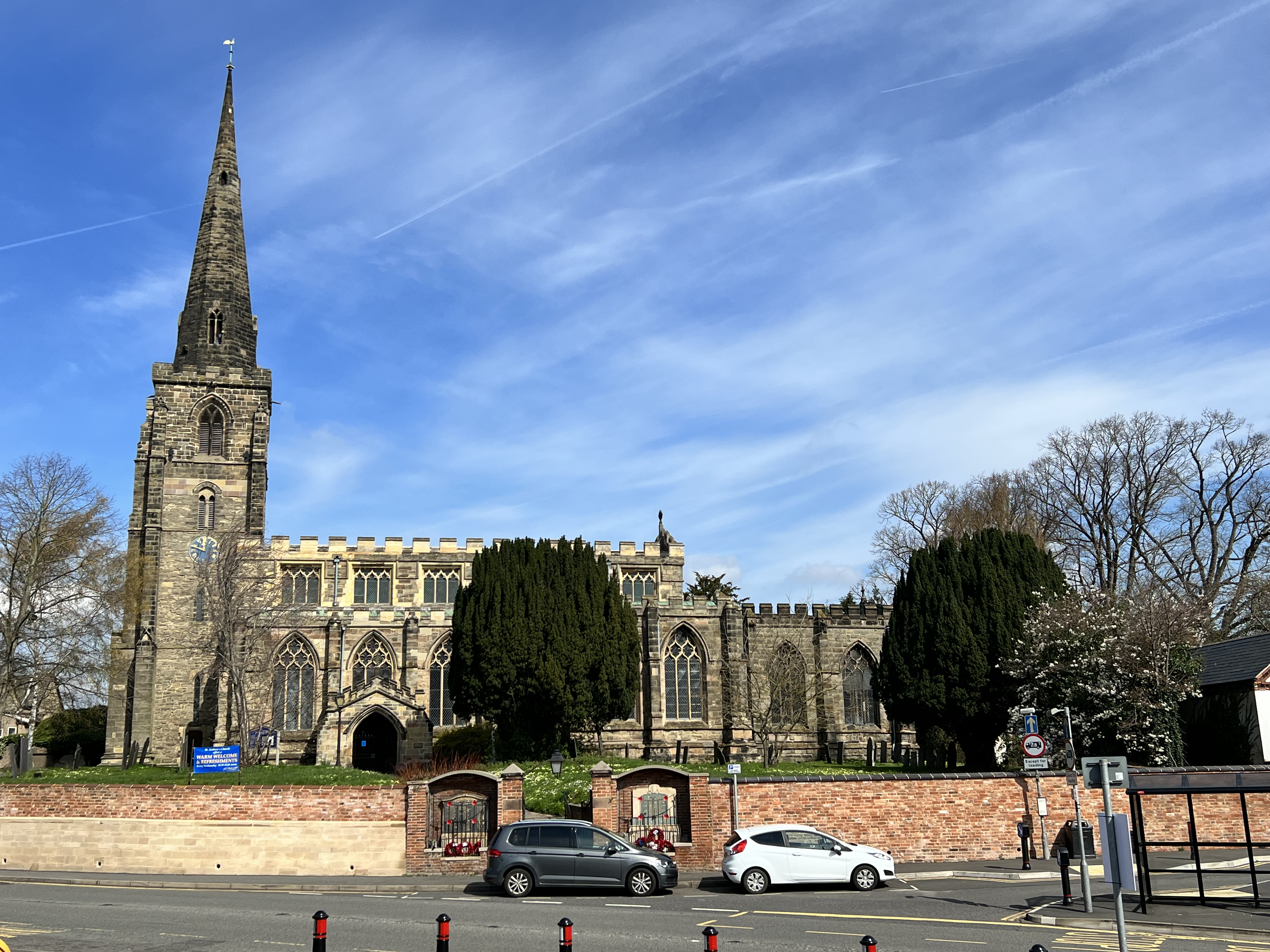
- St Andrew’s Church, Kegworth

- Location within Leicestershire
- 52°50′6.6″N 1°16′39.7″W
- OS grid reference: SK 48758 26713
- Location: Kegworth
- Country: England
- Denomination: Church of England

Architecture
- Heritage designation: Grade II* listed

Administration
- Diocese: Leicester
- Archdeaconry: Loughborough
- Deanery: Akeley East
- Parish: Kegworth

St Andrew's Church is a Grade II* listed Church of England church in Kegworth, Leicestershire.

== History ==
The church has existed since at least the 13th century as the lower part of the tower dates from this period. The remainder of the church is 14th and 15th century. The steeply pitched roof was replaced in the 15th century when the nave walls were raised to include the clerestory.

The spire was repaired by William Wootton in 1815. The Nottingham Review of 12 May 1815 reported the event as follows:

The Spire of Kegworth Church being much out of repair, the Churchwardens apprehending danger, agreed with Mr. William Wootton, senior, of the above place, to secure the same; which stands about fifty-five yards above the surface of the earth. On the 24th of April last, he and his son raised ladders four feet above the fane of the steeple; and at two o’clock on the same day, at that wondrous height, they played on the horn and clarionet, God save the King, and other select pieces. After which, Mr. W. senior, who is in the 60th year of his age, with the consent of his son, aged 35, called for his grandson, who has not yet attained his 6th year, to climb the amazing steeple, and to take the weathercock down, which weight about 6lb. The boy obeyed the order, and with a steady step ascended and descended to the great astonishment of the spectators. The spire is completed, and is now in excellent repair. We understand that the above spire is the 58th they have repaired.

A fire broke out on 20 December 1840 which reached the roof through a stove pipe. It was extinguished with ladders and buckets of water without too much damage.

In February 1843 strong winds stripped some lead off the roof and a window of the church was blown in. The steeple was repaired in 1843-44 by Mr. Price of Gotham.

During a service on 2 February 1851 the stove piping being somewhat blocked, overheated and the top was blown off. The flames, soot and falling fire gave children at the church the impression that the roof was on fire, and the congregation rushed en masse to the north door. Most of the congregation escaped unharmed, but one boy had several teeth knocked out and two others sustained head injuries.

It was restored at a cost of £1,400 (equivalent to £150,000 in 2025) between 1859 and 1860 by the contractor Mr. Garland of Nottingham under the supervision of the architect Joseph Mitchell of Sheffield The flat pitched roof installed at in the 15th century included fourteen carved bosses of figures of musicians all but one of which were re-carved in 1860. The high-backed church pews were replaced with low open rows of benches. The galleries were removed. The church reopened for public worship on 13 April 1860.

The tower and spire were later restored in 1875 and again in 1886.

== Fittings ==
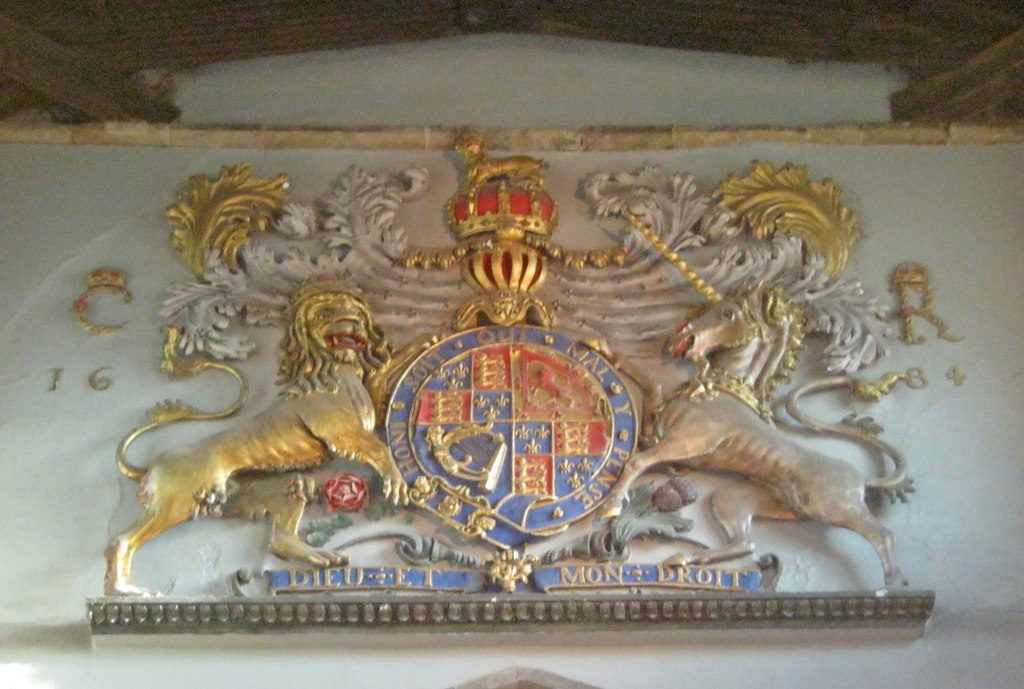
The Royal Coat of Arms

The chancel arch displays a fine Royal Coat of Arms dated 1685. This was restored in 1935.

== Organ ==
A new organ was installed by Mr Walker of London in 1860 which consisted of eight stops and a single manual.

In 1896 the vicar applied for a faculty to move the organ from the north west corner of the nave to the north transept. The move was unpopular with the parishioners and the disagreement ended up in the consistory court of the diocese of Peterborough. To support his case the vicar called in Arthur Page, organist of St Mary's Church, Nottingham, who agreed that it was a great disadvantage to have the congregation between the organ and the choir. The Chancellor eventually agreed with the request and granted the faculty.

The current pipe organ has 2 manuals, pedals and 17 speaking stops. It was built new for the church in 1953 by Roger Yates.

== Bells ==
The tower contains a ring of 8 bells. Six bells date from 1875 with a tenor weight of 17 long cwt 0 qr 3 lb (1,907 lb or 865 kg) and the remaining 2 were added in 1939.

== Churchyard ==
The churchyard contains memorials to two soldiers from the First World War. Corporal J Bowler of the 1st Battalion of the Sherwood Foresters who died on 12 May 1915 aged 38, and Private G Stevenson of the 1st Battalion of the Lincolnshire Regiment who died on 23 August 1916 aged 35.
