= Langley Priory =

Priory in Isley cum Langley, Leicestershire, England

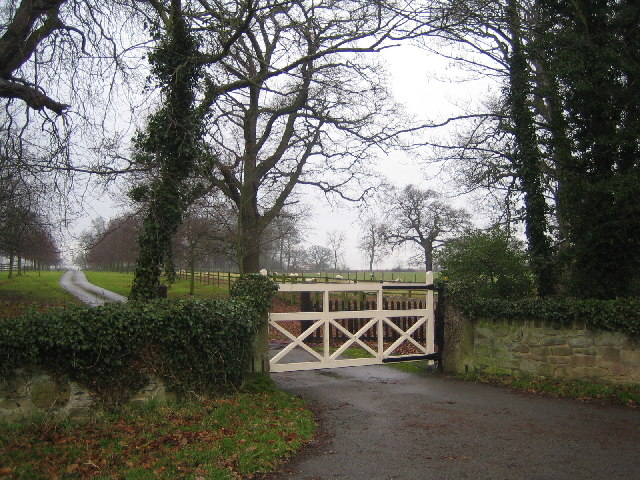

- Location within Leicestershire

Monastery information
- Other name: Langley Nunnery
- Order: Benedictine
- Established: c.1150
- Disestablished: 1536
- Mother house: Farewell Priory
- Dedication: "God and to the Blessed Virgin"
- Diocese: Diocese of Lincoln

People
- Founders: William and Burgia Pantulf

Site
- Location: Leicestershire, England
- Coordinates: 52.807776°N 1.358197°W

Langley Priory is a former Benedictine nunnery in the civil parish of Isley cum Langley, in the North West Leicestershire district, in the county of Leicestershire, England. It is located around a mile and a half south of East Midlands Airport; around a mile from the village of Diseworth.

== History ==
Langley Priory was founded c.1150 by William Pantulf and his wife Burgia. The first nuns who came to Langley came from Farewell Priory in Staffordshire. William donated the advowsons of the churches of Little Dalby and Somerby, and land in Langley, Little Dalby, Somerby and Tonge. Burgia donated land in Kettleby and tithes in Tonge and Wilson. Before 1205 the priory had also acquired land in Burrough, Diseworth, Long Whatton, Nottingham and Prestwold. The nuns also gained the advowson of Diseworth Church before 1220. By 1291 the priory was receiving an annual income of £20. 9d. from its temporalities.

The priory was founded in the Benedictine Order; in the late 13th century the nuns claimed to belong to the Cistercian Order, as this allowed them to avoid paying tithe on their lands. They were, however, forced to abandon their claims.

In 1354 the priory was visited by John Gynwell, Bishop of Lincoln, who recorded there were 12 nuns at the priory. A later visit by William Alnwick, Bishop of Lincoln, in 1440, reveals the number of nuns had fallen to eight, and that the priory's income had fallen, pushing the nuns £50 into debt.

The Valor Ecclesiasticus of 1535 lists the priory as having an income of £29. 7s. 4½d. In June 1536 the priory is recorded as being home to six nuns and the prioress. It was probably dissolved with the other small monasteries in 1536.

=== Prioresses of Langley Priory ===
- Rose, occurs 1229.
- Burgia, elected 1229-30.
- Isabel of Leicester, elected 1236-7, occurs 1265.
- Juliane of Winchester, appointed 1269.
- Alice of Tatyrsal, occurs 1275, died 1276.
- Margaret of Leicester, elected 1276, occurs 1278-9.
- Christine of Winchester, occurs 1284, resigned 1294-5.
- Amice de Burgh, confirmed 1295, died 1302.
- Alice Giffard, elected 1302.
- Elizabeth of Caldwell, elected 1306, occurs to 1332.
- Joan of Outheby, occurs from 1333 to 1336.
- Matanye, occurs 1350.
- Maud, occurs 1355.
- Margaret de Sulveye, occurs 1355 to 1374.
- Margaret Salhowe, occurs 1430.
- Margaret Pole, occurs 1441, resigned 1447-8.
- Margaret Bellairs, elected 1447-8, resigned 1485.
- Anne Shafton, elected 1485.
- Dulcia Bothe, occurs from 1507 to 1535.

== After Dissolution ==
At the dissolution the site and lands were leased to Thomas Grey for a yearly value of £7.5s.4d. (equivalent to £5,400 in 2025) Thomas Grey died on 22 February 1564. Langley was inherited by his son Thomas who died on 14 January 1608-9. His son Thomas (b. 1602) succeeded him. This Thomas Grey had four sons, Thomas, George, William and John. His eldest son Thomas was disinherited for marrying against his fathers consent. Langley Priory was shared between the remaining sons.

The Greys sold the property in 1686, by now known as Langley Hall, for £7,769.17s.6d. (equivalent to £1,580,600 in 2025) to Richard Cheslyn (1634-1717). Richard was succeeded by his son Robert Cheslyn (1691–1750) whose son Richard (1717–1787) was a barrister of the Middle Temple. This Richard spent £5,000 on plantations and gardens. On his death in 1787 Langley passed to his nephew Richard (1771–1843). Richard was deputy Lieutenant for the county of Leicestershire and Commissioner of Assessed Taxes. He was the father of Richard Cheslyn (1797–1858), an English amateur cricketer. He died on 13 January 1843.

In 1843 the house was purchased by John Shakespear from the Cheslyns for the sum of £82,000 (equivalent to £9,007,900 in 2025). On the death of John Shakespeare in 1858 the house passed to his nephew Charles Bowles. Charles obtained royal consent to adopt the surname of his uncle. Charles Shakespear died in 1899 leaving an estate valued at £107,478 and the estate passed to his son, Charles Bowles Shakespear. Charles Bowles Shakespear died aged 88 on 16 February 1959 leaving an estate valued at £86,245 The house was then lived in by Major John Hornsby Shakespear until his death aged 59 in 1970. The house was then bought by John S. Hine who lived there until 1981.

The remains of the priory were thought to have been incorporated into a later house which was also called "Langley Priory". Little of medieval origin remains within the current house: the central block was completely rebuilt in the early 19th century, and the two wings were largely rebuilt in the 16th and 17th centuries.

The house is currently used as a wedding venue. Despite its being in Leicestershire, the business' website claims the house is in Derbyshire.

== Civil parish ==
Langley Priory was a civil parish, in 1931 the parish had a population of 16. Langley Priory was formerly an extra-parochial tract, from 1858 Langley Priory was a civil parish in its own right until it was abolished on 1 April 1936 to form "Isley cum Langley".
