= André Deutsch =

British publisher (1917–2000)

André Deutsch CBE
- Born: 15 November 1917; Budapest, Austria-Hungary
- Died: 11 April 2000 (aged 82); London, England
- Occupation: Publisher
- Known for: Founder of publishing company André Deutsch Ltd

André Deutsch CBE (15 November 1917 – 11 April 2000) was a Hungarian-born British publisher who founded an eponymous publishing company in 1951.

== Biography ==
Deutsch was born on 15 November 1917 in Budapest, Hungary, the son of a Jewish dentist. He attended school in Budapest and in Vienna, Austria. The Anschluss led to him fleeing Austria, and in 1939, he settled in Britain, where he worked as floor manager at the Grosvenor House Hotel in London. When Hungary entered the Second World War on the side of the Germans in 1941, Deutsch was interned for some weeks as an "enemy alien".

After having learned the business of publishing while working for Francis Aldor (Aldor Publications, London), with whom he had been interned on the Isle of Man and who had introduced him to the industry, Deutsch left Aldor's employment after a few months to continue his burgeoning publishing career with the firm of Nicholson & Watson. After the war Deutsch founded his first company, Allan Wingate, but after a few years was forced out by one of his directors, Anthony Gibb. André Deutsch Limited began trading in 1952.

His small but influential publishing house was active until the 1990s, and included books by Jack Kerouac, Wole Soyinka, Earl Lovelace, Norman Mailer, William T. Vollmann, George Mikes, V. S. Naipaul, Ogden Nash, Eric Williams, Andrew Robinson, Philip Roth, Art Spiegelman, John Updike, Margaret Atwood, Charles Gidley Wheeler, Helene Hanff, Peter Benchley, Leon Uris, Molly Keane, Michael Rosen, Quentin Blake, Mary Melwood, John Cunliffe, and Ludwig Bemelmans. Deutsch employed dedicated editor Diana Athill, who in 1952 was a founding director of the publishing company that was given his name (and who in her memoir Stet described him as "possibly the most difficult man in London"). A number of book series were established including The Language Library, Grafton Books (works on librarianship, bibliography and book collecting) and the Introduces guides.

In the 1989 Queen's Birthday Honours, Deutsch was appointed a CBE.

Deutsch died in London on 11 April 2000, aged 82.

== In popular culture ==
Author John le Carré based his recurring character Toby Esterhase on Deutsch, both in physical appearance and in replicating Deutsch's unique manner of speech:

When David [i.e. Le Carré] came to write his novel Tinker, Tailor, Soldier, Spy, he would draw on Deutsch for his character Toby Esterhase, who like his original would speak his own form of English.

— Adam Sisman, John Le Carré: the Biography

== Current imprint ==
The name "André Deutsch" became an imprint of Carlton Publishing Group, which purchased the company from Video Collection International Plc in 2000.

== See also ==
- List of publishers
- Paul Hamlyn
- George Weidenfeld
