= Datchworth =

Village in Hertfordshire, England

Coordinates: 51.857503°N 0.159784°W

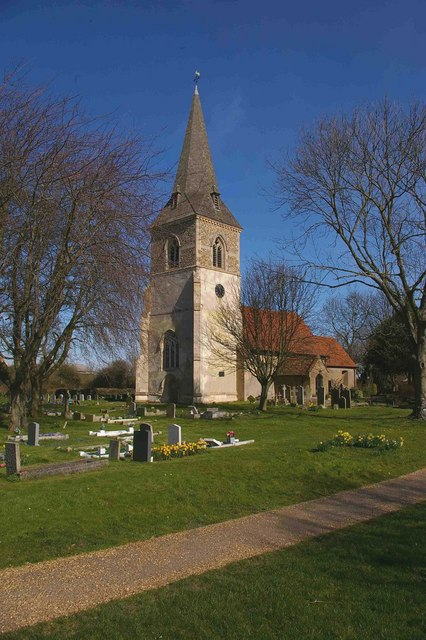
- All Saints' Church

- Location within Hertfordshire
- Population: 1,513 (Parish, 2021)
- District: East Hertfordshire
- Shire county: Hertfordshire
- Region: East
- Country: England
- Sovereign state: United Kingdom
- Post town: KNEBWORTH
- Postcode district: SG3
- Dialling code: 01438
- UK Parliament: Stevenage

Datchworth (previously datchwood) is a village and civil parish in the East Hertfordshire district of Hertfordshire, England. It lies 1 mile (1.6 km) south-east of Knebworth, its post town, and between the towns of Hertford, Stevenage and Welwyn Garden City. At the 2021 census the parish had a population of 1,513.

Sited on the Roman road from St Albans to Puckeridge, the village has examples of Saxon clearings in several locations. Datchworth has a village green where there are two pubs (The Plough and The Tilbury) and a sports club.

== Origins ==
The name Datchworth is thought to originate from a Saxon lord called Daecca (pronounced Datcher), who settled here around the year 700 AD. 'Worth' comes from worthig, which means enclosure.

== History ==
The arrival of the Normans gave Datchworth a written record in the Domesday Book. This included an account of the occupants and land values in the 11th century.

Standing at the eastern side of Datchworth Green is the whipping post. Its last recorded use was on 27 July 1665 when two 'vagabonds' were publicly flogged. Stocks stood near the post too, but there is no trace of them now. The stocks are thought to have been removed in 1899, however, there are stocks located close to All Saints' Church.

During the Second World War the last enemy-action incident of any kind on British soil occurred at 09:00 on 29 March 1945 when a V-1 flying bomb struck a nearby field in Woolmer Green Another landed at Iwade in Kent, an hour later, after being hit by anti-aircraft fire.

The Datchworth Museum contains a collection of local artefacts. Located in a former smithy, the museum operates a limited opening schedule, being accessible from 2.00 p:m until 4.30 p:m on the third Sunday of every month. In 2022, the museum recorded a total of 30 visitors, making it the second least-visited tourist attraction in England. (Note: The museum's total of 30 visitors placed it equal second-to-lowest in the VisitEngland 2022 annual survey. It shared this position with the museum of the Huddersfield Astronomical Society in West Yorkshire. The attraction with the lowest number of visitors in 2022, 20 in total, was the Diseworth Heritage Centre in Leicestershire.)

== Notable people ==
- Barry Norman — and his novelist wife Diana Narracott
- Chris Winsley - International Headhunter
