= Hathern =

Village in Leicestershire, England

Coordinates: 52.7956°N 1.2563°W

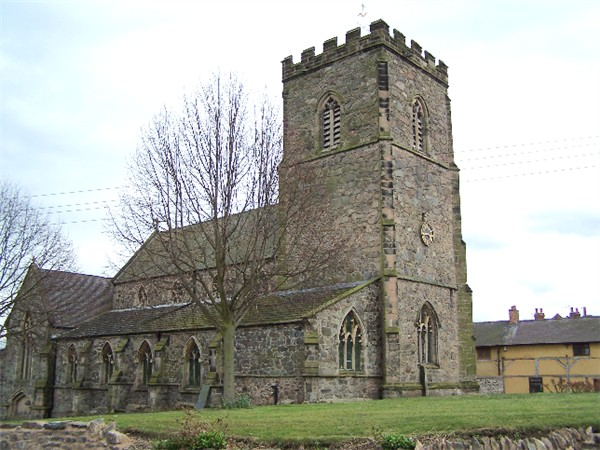
- St Peter & St Paul Church, Hathern

- Location within Leicestershire
- Population: 1,866 (2011)
- District: Charnwood
- Shire county: Leicestershire
- Region: East Midlands
- Country: England
- Sovereign state: United Kingdom
- Post town: Loughborough
- Postcode district: LE12
- Dialling code: 01509
- Police: Leicestershire
- Fire: Leicestershire
- Ambulance: East Midlands
- UK Parliament: Loughborough

Hathern is a village and civil parish in the Charnwood district of Leicestershire, England. The village itself is located in the north of the district, and is just north of Loughborough. It is served by the A6. The parish has a population of about 1,800. Nearby places are Dishley, Long Whatton, and Zouch, over the border in Nottinghamshire. Residents of the village have, in recent years, campaigned to prevent the green "wedge" separating Loughborough, Shepshed and Hathern from being built on. The village is home to the Swift Sock Factory, one of only a small number of independent sock manufacturers left in the UK.

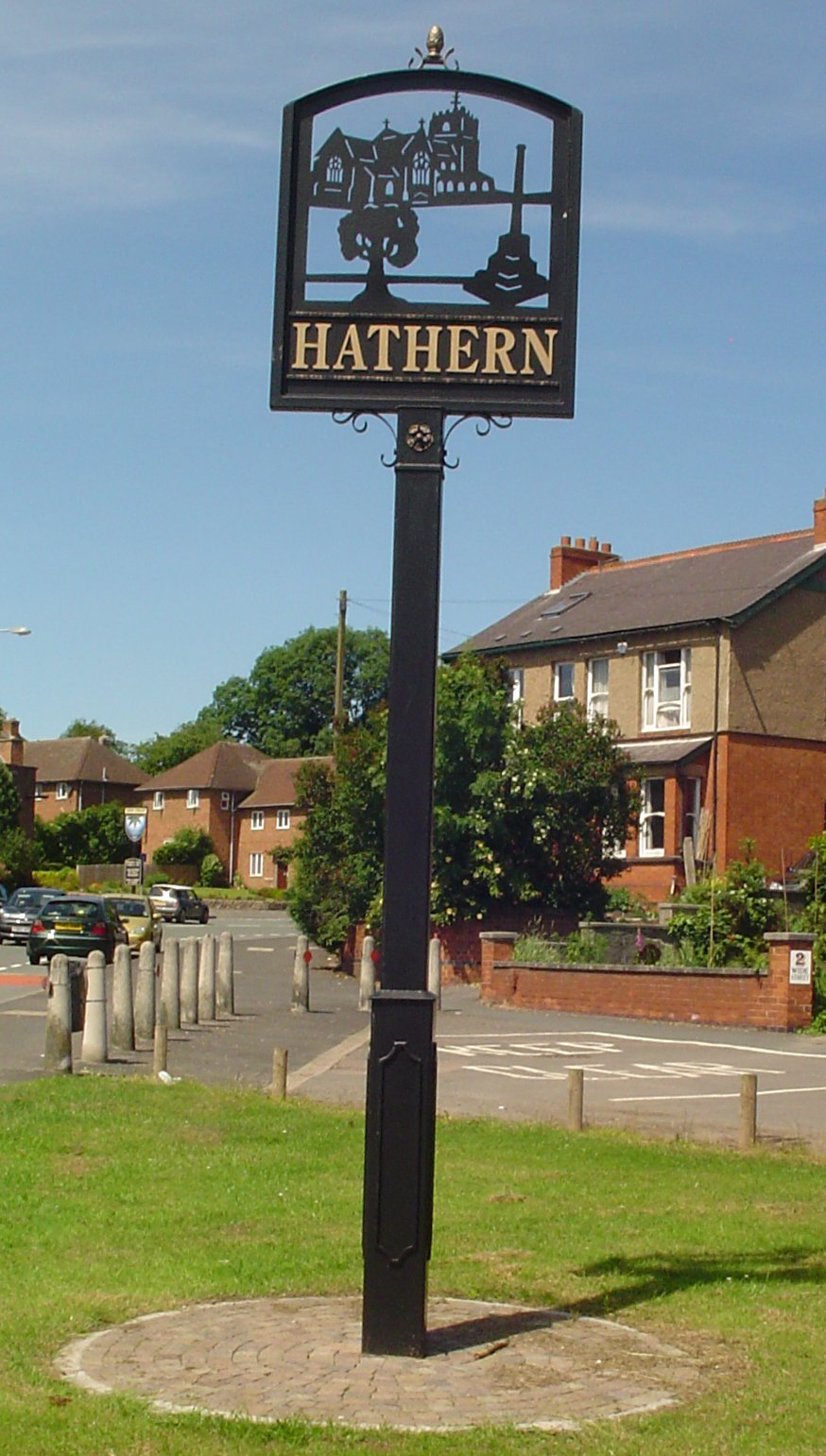
Hathern Signpost

== Notable residents ==
John Heathcoat (1783–1861), inventor and industrialist, operated a textile mill in Hathern (where, in 1808–9, he invented the bobbin net machine, for weaving a lace-like hexagonal net), before moving his business first to Loughborough, and later to Tiverton, Devon.

== History ==
A settlement probably existed here in the Saxon period but the first written record was in the Domesday Book where it was called Avederne, Old English for hawthorne. Prominent in the centre of the village is Hathern cross, dating from the 14th century. Like most villages in this part of the country, farming and framework knitting were major sources of employment. The parish church dates mainly from the 14th century although a place of worship probably existed on the site in earlier times. An ancient font, one of the oldest in the county is regularly used for baptisms.
