= Kegworth =

Village in Leicestershire, England

Coordinates: 52°50′13″N 1°17′1″W

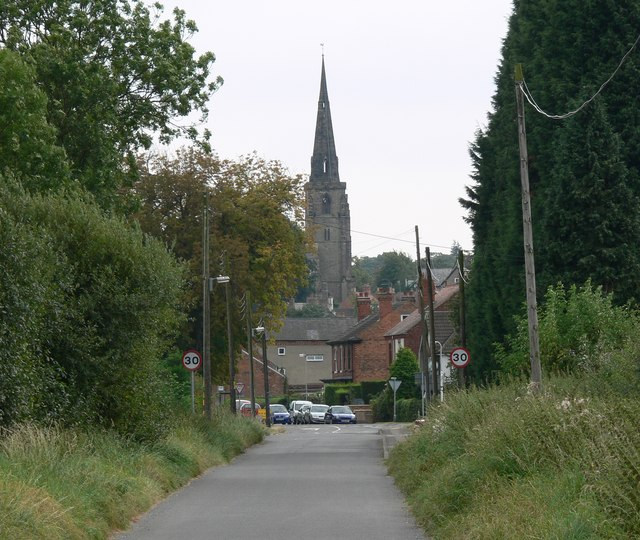
- View of Kegworth from Long Lane

- Location within Leicestershire
- Population: 4,290 (2021 census)
- District: North West Leicestershire
- Shire county: Leicestershire
- Region: East Midlands
- Country: England
- Sovereign state: United Kingdom
- Post town: Derby
- Postcode district: DE74
- Dialling code: 01509
- Police: Leicestershire
- Fire: Leicestershire
- Ambulance: East Midlands
- UK Parliament: North West Leicestershire
- Website: kegworthparishcouncil.gov.uk

Kegworth (/ˈkɛɡwərθ/) is a large village and civil parish in the North West Leicestershire district of Leicestershire, in the East Midlands region, England.

The village is situated between the M1 motorway to the west and the River Soar to the east – the latter also marking county boundary with Nottinghamshire. It is 6 miles north of Loughborough, 12 miles southwest of Nottingham, 12.5 miles southeast of Derby, and 17 miles north of Leicester. The population of Kegworth as of the 2011 census was 3,601.

Kegworth is twinned with Bois-Guillaume, a suburban town located on the plateau immediately to the north of Rouen in Normandy, north-western France.

== History ==
The site of Kegworth was situated well within the territory of the Coritani (or Corieltauvi), one of the most powerful Ancient British tribes. A date cannot be put on the foundations of the first settlement, although Anglo-Saxon burials have been found in Kingston-on-Soar and at Hathern, a pin from the 7th century was also found near the hermitage, which may indicate the date and location of the earliest settlers. The name of Kegworth comes from two languages, Old English and Danish, so it must date from some time between 874 and 1086. It means "worth" or "enclosure" of a man named Kaggi, the Danish name for redbeard. However, some sources claim it may mean locked enclosure, from caega "key", an Old English word. It was recorded in the Domesday Book as being held by Earl Harold Godwin, who became the last of the Saxon kings. After Harold's defeat at the Battle of Hastings in 1066 the Earl Hugh of Chester was given the land by William the Conqueror. It was known in those days as Cachworde, Caggworth and Cogga.

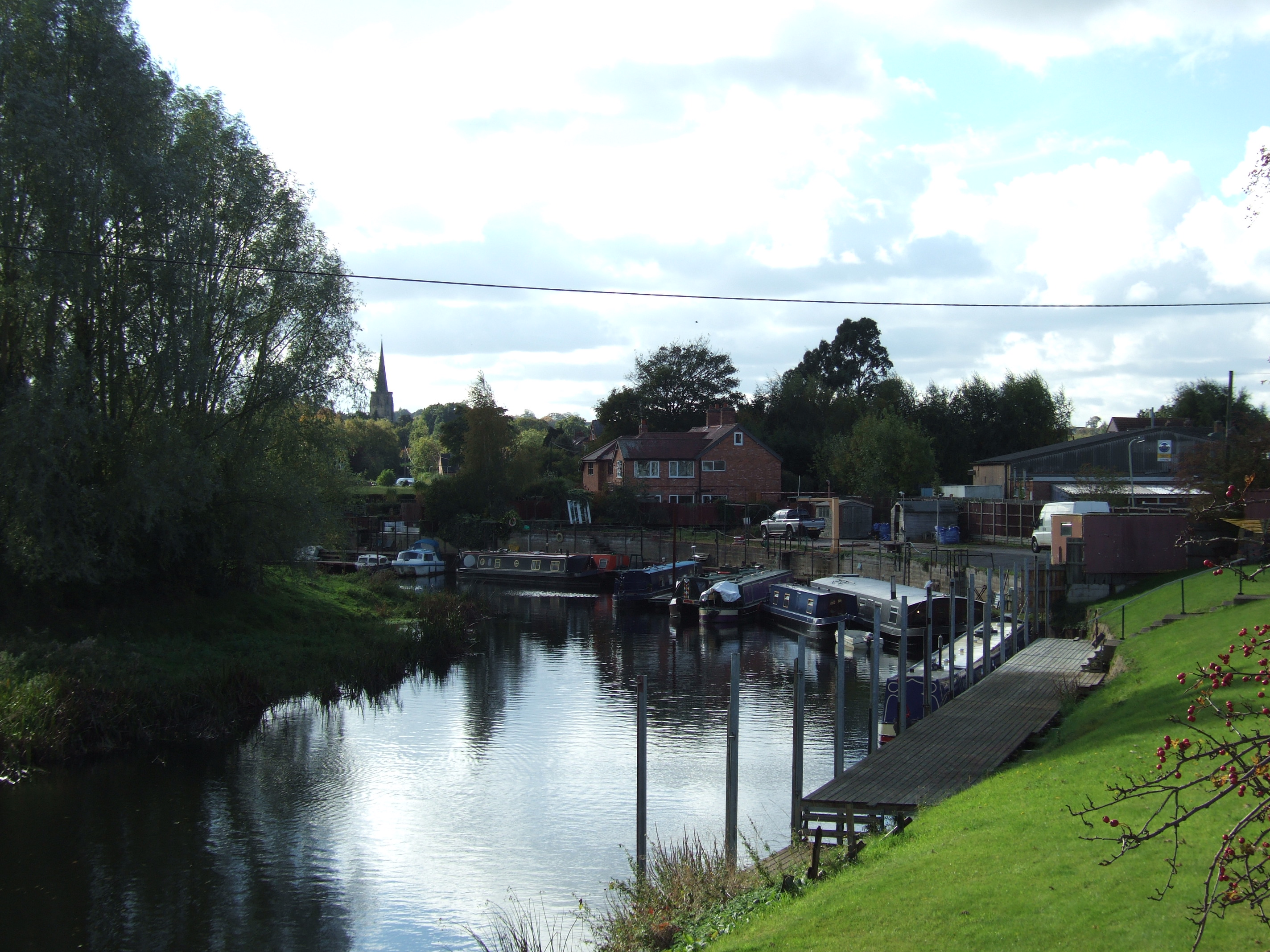
The view from Soar Bridge — the canalised river is the border between the counties of Leicestershire and Nottinghamshire

After the royalists defeated Simon de Montfort in 1265, estates gained by the Earl of Gloucester included land in Kegworth. The privilege to hold a weekly market was granted in 1290. During the Middle Ages the parish was responsible for maintaining the condition of the roads. To try to improve the rough roads in the village, an Act of Parliament was passed in 1555 ordering every man in the parish to work for four (later six) days a year on the roads; each farmer had to provide horses and carts according to his land holding. This continued until the early 18th century when, with the increase in traffic, it became necessary to change this to paid labour.

Although farming was a large factor in Kegworth life and still remains on the fringes, industry started in the late 18th century/early 19th century with the introduction of stockingers shops. Some still exist (e.g. behind the former Britannia public house) and can be recognised by the long rows of windows on the first floor. As the industry grew, small courtyards of cottages were built in the old farm yards. Women and children also worked when they could, and the hosiery and lace trade were ranked as two of the most important industries in the village from 1841 onwards. The Kegworth hand frame stockingers were highly skilled in the art of making silk stockings and they received many orders from royalty and people of high rank. Queen Victoria, the Prince of Wales, the Danish royal family and the King of Spain were all customers of the stockingers of Kegworth. Meeting House Yard lay behind the present 'Friends' Cottage', and included a Quaker graveyard. The last trace of these 'yards' was demolished when the entrance to Australia Yard was removed to make way for the library in High Street.

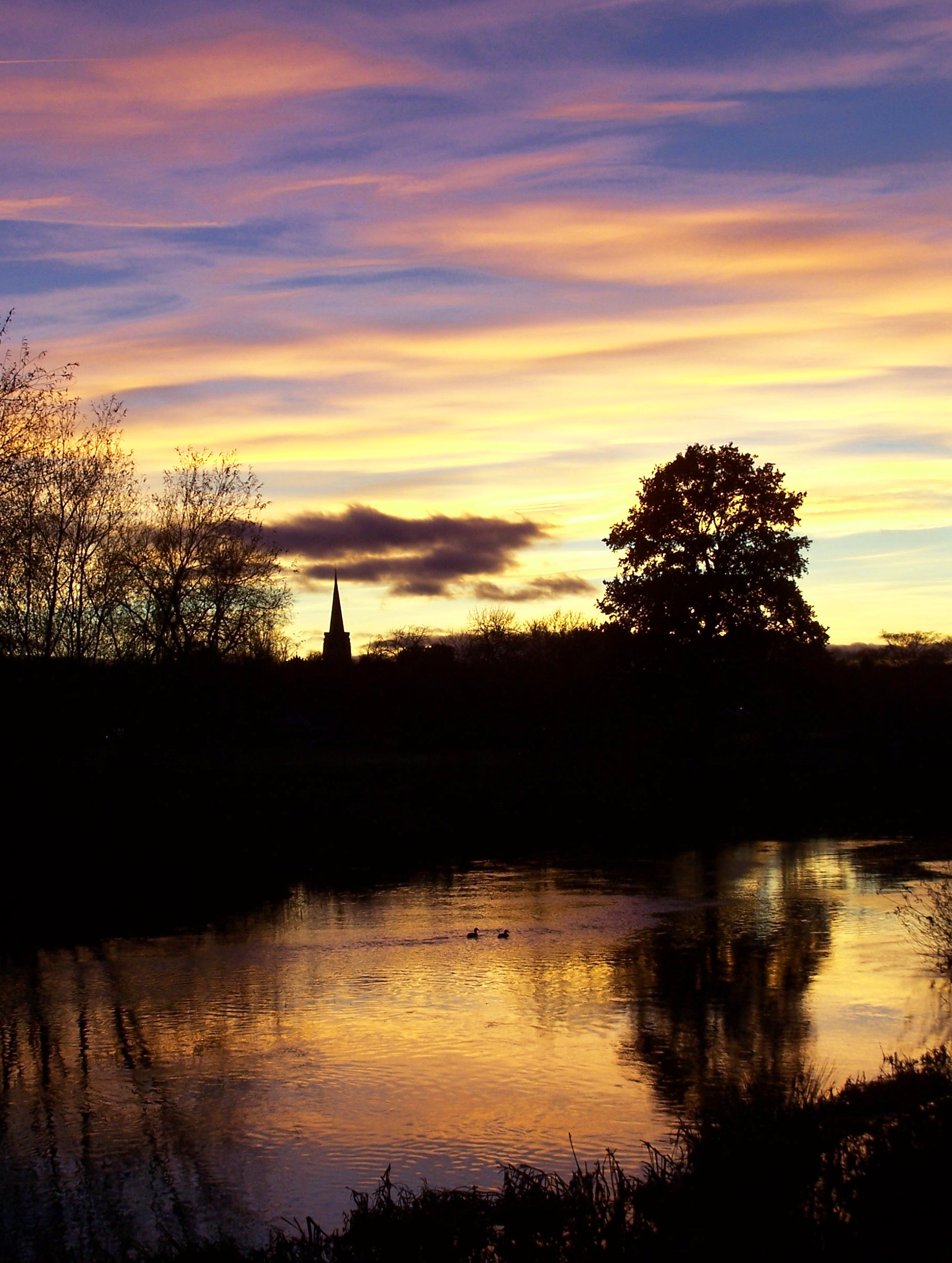
Kegworth sunset from the Soar Bridge

A depression in the 1890s coincided with the introduction of the internal combustion engine, a motorbike factory was started that developed into the present Slack and Parrs. Domestic service was also important. In 1851 as many as 121 people were described as servants, housekeepers or charwomen. In 1899 their work was arduous with long hours, and the restricted personal freedom and the lack of privacy was poor by the standards of today but at the time they counted themselves lucky to be fed, clothed and housed. Industrialisation was the beginning of the end of this era in Kegworth's history, but there were still socks and stockings being made in the village as late as the 1940s. Despite the growth in trade and manufacturing, there was only a very slight increase in population during the 19th century. The number of inhabitants rose from 1,416 people in 1801 to 2,078 a century later, but with actual decline in some decades, today there are approximately 3,500 people living in the village with 1,500 houses.

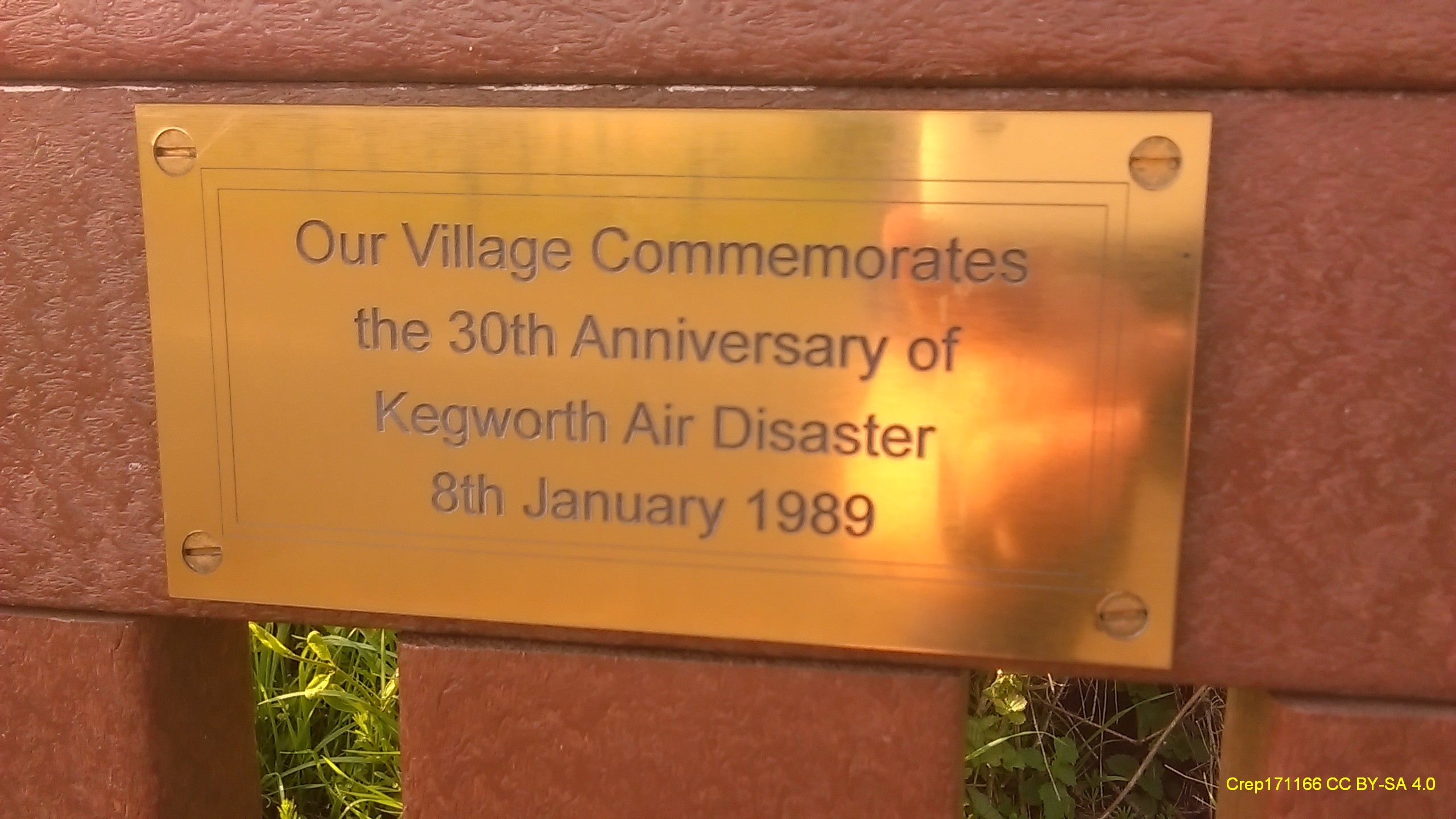
Kegworth air disaster 30th anniversary memorial bench

47 people died in a plane crash on 8 January 1989, when it came down just short of the runway on the eastern side of the nearby East Midlands Airport. Although this was outside the village, it has subsequently been referred to as the Kegworth air disaster. A memorial to those who died in the crash stands in the village cemetery on Whatton Road. There is also a plaque sited on the Ashby Road bridge over the M1, close to where the plane came down. Since 1989, the Parish Council and those who remember that fateful night have marked each anniversary by laying wreaths at both memorial sites. A special commemorative service was held in 2019 at St Andrew's Church in the village, to mark the 30th anniversary of the disaster. Survivors, relatives and emergency services first-responders attended.

Kegworth has always prospered from its advantages of trade and routes. Originally these were farming, road and river, later textiles, railway and canal, and now light industry, motorway and airport. It has been lucky in having relative prosperity and slow but steady growth, which has given it the character of a friendly, active community. The nearby University of Nottingham Sutton Bonington Campus has grown markedly since 2006 and many students now live in the village. A number of modern housing developments to the south of the village expanded Kegworth in the 2010s and further developments are making use of brown field sites. Kegworth was part of the rural district of Castle Donington until 1974 when it became part of the district of North West Leicestershire, whose administrative centre is located at Coalville.

== Structures ==
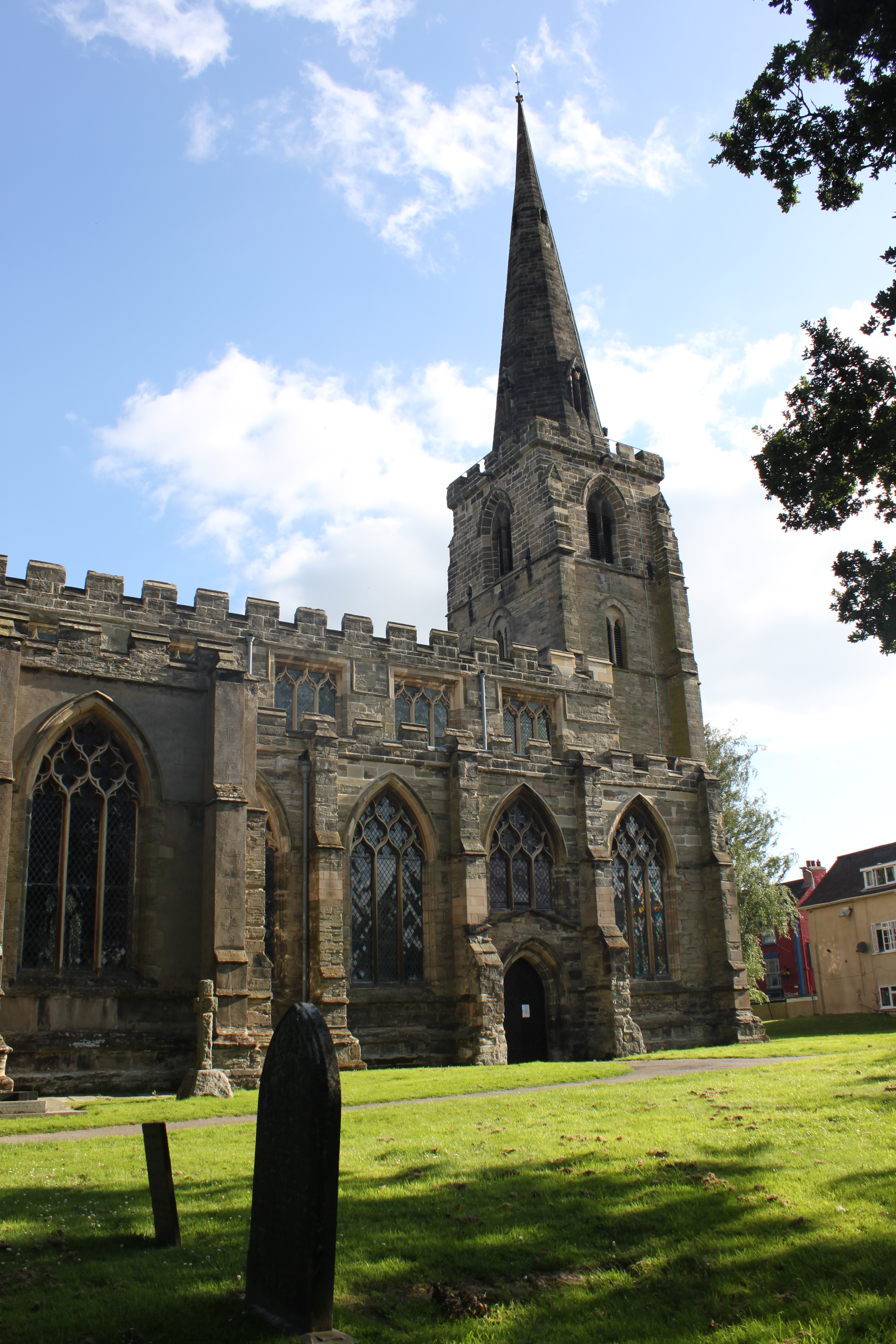
North side of St Andrew's Church

The earliest surviving building is St Andrew's Parish Church. The tower base dates from 1250 and the rest was built in 1370 when the two manors of Kegworth were united under a single Lord of the manor. The next oldest building visible is the Cruck Cottage on the High Street, which until 2021 was the street front of the Cottage Restaurant. This is from the 15th century, but the stucco covering conceals its age. Many other buildings similarly hide their oldest parts under stucco or modern fronts, as at the top of Packington Hill, where early 18th-century timber frames show at the rear.

Many buildings in High Street and London Road date from the 18th century, when the main London to Manchester road went up High Street and down Packington Hill. Some were town houses, others farmhouses with yards. Most of the latter have had their yards subsequently built on. The barn of number 55 High Street was demolished in 1979 to make room for another house, but the farmyard of number 48 remains, although the farmhouse was rebuilt in Victorian times. The internal road system of the village gradually developed as time went on as it became necessary to obtain access to neighbouring villages. The Romans used a ford across the River Trent nearby and a Romano-British farm lies at the end of Long Lane. A Saxon cemetery was found two hundred years ago and the bumps and hollows between the A6 and the River Soar may be the remains of a Saxon village.

== Local facilities ==
=== Transport links ===
Formerly, the A6 ran through Kegworth: up London Road, through the Market Place and down Derby Road, where it met Junction 24 of the M1. In 2018, the A6 was rerouted via a bypass to the south of the village. The village can still be accessed directly from Junction 24 via Derby Road.

The village is also close to East Midlands Airport and the East Midlands Gateway freight terminal. The nearest train station is East Midlands Parkway railway station.

Due to the village's proximity to the airport, it is served by the Skylink Derby bus route, operated by Kinchbus. This route operates 24/7, including bank holidays, between Leicester and Derby via East Midlands Airport.

The village is included in the West Rushcliffe Zone of the Nottsbus On Demand service. This is an on-demand bus service which connects Kegworth to connections at East Midlands Parkway train station, East Midlands Airport, and Clifton South tram stop, and to neighbouring villages such as Gotham and East Leake.

=== Education ===
The village is served by Kegworth Primary School, which is a community school which takes pupils aged 4 to 11 years. The school was rated good at its last Ofsted inspection. Beyond the primary school age, most children attend schools in Castle Donington and Shepshed.

The village is a short distance away from Sutton Bonington Campus of the University of Nottingham. Many students studying at the campus live in Kegworth: as of the 2021 census, 24% of Kegworth's population reported as full-time students, more than 3 times the national average.

The village has both Anglican and Baptist churches.

Shops in the village include a supermarket, butcher, pharmacy and optician. There are a number of cafes, restaurants and takeaway food outlets including fish and chips, Indian and Chinese cuisine. Kegworth has several public houses, a doctor's surgery and a village hall that hosts village events and the local playgroup. Kegworth has thriving sports clubs, which include the Kegworth Imperial football club, Kegworth Town Cricket Club and Kegworth Bowls Club. There are five parks with play areas for younger children and a skate park. The village has a library and a fully accredited museum of local history. One Kegworth community group also organise many village events throughout the year such as the Easter Charter market, Sideley Park family fun day and food festival, and the Christmas market.

== Notable people ==
Thomas Parkinson was Rector of Kegworth from 1789 until his death in 1830.

Cartoonist Bill Tidy was a long-term resident of Kegworth in the 1980s and 1990s.

Olympic swimmer Adam Peaty.

Biologist Keith Campbell was resident in the village. He is well known as one of the team to clone the sheep Dolly and produced further clones, sisters to Dolly, during his time in Kegworth.

Irish poet Thomas Moore lived at The Cedars, London Road, Kegworth, for almost a year.

== See also ==
- Kegworth railway station
- Kegworth air disaster
