= List of early British railway companies =

The following list sets out to show all the railway companies set up by Acts of Parliament in the 19th century before 1860. Most of them became constituent parts of the emerging main-line railway companies, often immediately after being built. Some continued as independent companies until the 1923 Grouping; a few retained that independence until 1947. They have been listed under Scottish; and English and Welsh early railways; and under the later main line company which absorbed them.

Each of the main line companies after the Grouping has an article listing all companies who became part of, and jointly part of, individual companies. Many of those had been in separate existence since being set up in the 19th century, and were only in 1923 losing that individuality.

The list is by no means complete: in 1846 alone there were 272 railways agreed by Act of Parliament, although not all of those were built, since it was the time of the Railway Mania. In addition lines might be extensions to existing ones, but floated as a separate company to separate the risk, and to ring-fence subscriptions, or promoted by a company which was mostly financed by an existing company. An example is the Dore and Chinley Railway which was floated as a company and then adopted and largely financed by the Midland.

== Scottish early railways ==
=== Caledonian Railway (incorporated 1845) ===
- Caledonian Railway became part of the London, Midland and Scottish Railway on 1 July 1923 under the Railways Act 1921.
  - Aberdeen Railway opened in stages between 1848 and 1853
  - Brechin and Edzell District Railway
  - Cathcart District Railway
  - Crieff and Comrie Railway authorised 1890
  - Crieff and Methven Junction Railway opened 1867
  - Crieff Junction Railway opened 1856
  - Dunblane, Doune and Callander Railway incorporated in 1846
  - Dundee and Newtyle Railway opened 1841 (incorporated in Scottish Central Railway)
  - Glasgow and Paisley Joint Railway opened 12 August 1840.
  - Glasgow Central Railway; opened 26 November 1894
  - Glasgow, Garnkirk and Coatbridge Railway opened 1831 as the Garnkirk and Glasgow Railway
  - Glasgow, Paisley and Greenock Railway opened 29 March 1840; merged with the Caledonian Railway 1847
  - Hamilton and Strathaven Railway opened 6 August 1860; taken over by the Caledonian Railway 1864
  - Lanarkshire and Dunbartonshire Railway authorised in 1891
  - Lochearnhead, St Fillans and Comrie Railway opened Comrie to St Fillans 1 October 1901; opened to Balqhidder 1 May 1905
  - Perth, Almond Valley & Methven Railway opened 1858
  - Scottish Central Railway (to Perth and Dundee), formed in 1845
  - Scottish North Eastern Railway (to Aberdeen)
  - Wishaw and Coltness Railway

Independent Lines operated by the Caledonian Railway

- Callander and Oban Railway opened 1 July 1880
- Killin Railway, opened 13 March 1886
- Lanarkshire and Ayrshire Railway opened 1888

=== Glasgow and South Western Railway (title assumed 1850) ===
- Glasgow and South Western Railway became part of the London, Midland and Scottish Railway on 1 January 1923 under the Railways Act 1921.
  - Ardrossan and Johnstone Railway opened 6 November 1831; became the dual-tracked Ardrossan Railway on 23 July 1840
  - Bridge of Weir Railway opened 1864
  - Glasgow and Paisley Joint Railway opened 12 August 1840.
  - Glasgow, Paisley, Kilmarnock and Ayr Railway opened 12 August 1840
  - Glasgow, Barrhead and Kilmarnock Joint Railway opened 29 September 1848
  - Greenock and Ayrshire Railway opened 23 December 1869
  - Kilmarnock and Troon Railway: First railway in Scotland authorised by Act of Parliament, opened 6 July 1812; originally worked by horses, converted to steam operation in 1817
  - Maidens and Dunure Railway opened 17 May 1906
  - Paisley and Renfrew Railway opened 21 July 1835; Scotch gauge railway originally locomotive hauled, then down graded to horse operation. Reopened as dual track, standard gauge, line 1 May 1866.

=== Great North of Scotland Railway (incorporated 1845) ===
- Great North of Scotland Railway became part of the London and North Eastern Railway on 1 January 1923 under the Railways Act 1921.
  - Aberdeen and Turriff Railway
  - Alford Valley Railway built 1859
  - Banffshire Railway
  - Banff, Macduff and Turriff Extension Railway
  - Banff, Portsoy and Strathisla Railway
  - Deeside Railway
  - Formartine and Buchan Railway
  - Inverury and Old Meldrum Junction Railway
  - Keith and Dufftown Railway
  - Morayshire Railway opened 10 August 1852
  - Strathspey Railway

=== Highland Railway (title assumed 1865) ===
- Highland Railway became part of the London, Midland and Scottish Railway on 1 January 1923 under the Railways Act 1921.
  - Dingwall and Skye Railway opened 19 August 1870
  - Duke of Sutherland's Railway opened 19 June 1871
  - Findhorn Railway opened 18 April 1859
  - Inverness and Aberdeen Junction Railway opened 18 August 1858
  - Inverness and Nairn Railway (INR) opened 5 November 1855
  - Inverness and Perth Junction Railway opened 9 September 1863
  - Inverness and Ross-shire Railway opened 23 March 1863
  - Nairn and Keith Railway opened 1858 amalgamated with INR 1861
  - Perth and Dunkeld Railway opened 7 April 1856
  - Sutherland Railway opened 13 April 1868
  - Sutherland and Caithness Railway opened 28 July 1874
  - Wick and Lybster Railway

=== North British Railway (incorporated 1844) ===
- North British Railway became part of the London and North Eastern Railway on 1 January 1923 under the Railways Act 1921.
  - Ballochney Railway opened 8 August 1828
  - Dundee and Arbroath Railway
  - Edinburgh and Dalkeith Railway opened 1831
  - Edinburgh and Glasgow Railway opened 28 July 1863
  - Edinburgh Suburban and Southside Junction Railway
  - Glasgow, Yoker and Clydebank Railway authorised in 1878
  - Invergarry and Fort Augustus Railway opened 1901
  - Kincardine Line open to Kincardine in 1893, and on to Dunfermline in 1906
  - Monkland and Kirkintilloch Railway first public steam railway in Scotland opened 1826
  - Newburgh and North Fife Railway
  - Slamannan Railway opened 31 August 1840
  - Stirling and Dunfermline Railway opened progressively between 1850 and 1853
  - West Highland Railway opened 7 August 1894 with an extension to Mallaig opened 1901.

== English and Welsh early railways ==
This list of lines in England and Wales is ordered roughly by region, with the exception of the GWR which was a very large company even pre-1900.

=== East ===
- Great Eastern Railway
  - Eastern Counties Railway (ECR) opened 20 June 1839; original 5 ft gauge converted to standard in 1845, absorbed into GER Aug 1862
    - Eastern Union Railway, incorporated 1844, opened 1846, absorbed 1847.
      - Eastern Union and Hadleigh Junction Railway
      - Ipswich and Bury Railway
    - Colchester, Stour Valley, Sudbury and Halstead Railway, incorporated 1846, opened 1848
    - Saffron Walden Railway incorporated 1861, sponsored by ECR.
  - Northern and Eastern Railway incorporated 1836 gauge conversion as with ECR
  - Commercial Railway, opened 1840, renamed London and Blackwall Railway; extended to Tilbury with ECR 1854 (authorised 1852 as London, Tilbury and Southend Railway (LT&SR)), absorbed by GER 1866. Started with non-standard gauge, converted 1849.
  - Ely, Haddenham and Sutton Railway (later Ely and St Ives Railway), authorised 1864, opened 1866, leased by ECR since opening, absorbed by GER 1897
  - Norfolk Railway
  - Colne Valley and Halstead Railway, incorporated 1856
  - East Anglian Railways (the plural is correct) formed by merger in 1847, absorbed by ECR 1862
    - Lynn and Dereham Railway
    - Lynn and Ely Railway
    - Ely and Huntingdon Railway
  - East Suffolk Railway (re-incorporation of the Halesworth, Beccles and Haddiscoe Railway in 1854), absorbed by ECR 1859
    - Yarmouth and Haddiscoe Railway absorbed 1858
    - Lowestoft and Beccles Railway absorbed 1858
- Midland and Great Northern Joint Railway incorporated 1893

=== Great Western Railway ===
- Great Western Railway incorporated 1835, opened London to Maidenhead Bridge 4 June 1838, completed throughout to Bristol 30 June 1841
  - Hayle Railway opened 23 December 1837, closed for rebuilding 16 February 1852, reopened by West Cornwall Railway
  - Cheltenham and Great Western Union Railway opened Swindon to Cirencester 31 May 1841, opened throughout to Cheltenham 13 October 1847
  - Bristol and Exeter Railway opened to Bridgwater 14 June 1841, completed in stages to Exeter 1 May 1844, amalgamated with GWR 1 January 1876
  - Cornwall Minerals Railway opened 1 June 1874 replacing and connecting several earlier railways and tramways. Amalgamated with GWR 1 July 1896
    - Par Tramway, construction started c.1841, completed north of Pontsmill 1847, extended to Par Harbour 1855
    - Newquay Railway authorised 1844, completed 1849
    - Lostwithiel and Fowey Railway opened 1 June 1869, closed 1 January 1880, transferred to CMR 27 June 1893 and reopened 1893
    - Newquay and Cornwall Junction Railway opened 1 July 1869, transferred to CMR 1 June 1874
  - Liskeard and Caradon Railway opened 28 November 1844, vested in GWR 1 July 1909
  - Shrewsbury and Chester Railway opened 4 November 1846, amalgamated with GWR 1 September 1854
  - South Devon Railway opened 30 May 1846, completed in stages to Plymouth 2 April 1849, amalgamated with GWR 1 February 1876
    - Torquay branch opened 18 December 1848
    - South Devon and Tavistock Railway opened 22 June 1859
    - Dartmouth and Torbay Railway completed 16 August 1864
    - Launceston and South Devon Railway opened 22 June 1865
    - Moretonhampstead and South Devon Railway opened 4 July 1866
    - Buckfastleigh, Totnes and South Devon Railway opened 1 May 1872
  - Berks and Hants Railway opened Reading to Hungerford 21 December 1847 and Reading to Basingstoke 1 November 1848; Berks and Hants Extension Hungerford to Devizes opened 11 November 1862
  - Wilts, Somerset and Weymouth Railway, opened Chippenham to Westbury 5 September 1848; completed in stages to Weymouth 20 January 1857
  - Shrewsbury and Birmingham Railway opened 1 June 1849, amalgamated with GWR 1 September 1854
  - South Wales Railway opened Chepstow to Landore 18 June 1850, Chepstow Bridge opened 19 June 1862, amalgamated with GWR 1 January 1862
  - Gloucester and Dean Forest Railway opened 19 September 1851
  - Vale of Neath Railway opened 24 September 1851, amalgamated into GWR 1 February 1865
  - West Cornwall Railway opened 11 March 1852 including previous Hayle Railway, transferred to GWR 1 January 1868
  - Hereford, Ross and Gloucester Railway opened 11 July 1853
  - Wycombe Railway opened 1 August 1854
  - Abingdon Railway opened 2 June 1856
  - Bridport Railway opened 12 November 1857, bought by GWR 1 July 1901, closed 5 May 1975
  - Liskeard and Looe Railway, railway opened 11 May 1858, vested in GWR 1 January 1923
  - East Somerset Railway first stage opened 9 November 1858, completed 1 March 1862
  - Great Western and Brentford Railway opened 18 July 1858
  - Cornwall Railway opened to Truro 4 May 1859, extended to Falmouth 21 August 1863, amalgamated with GWR 1 July 1889
  - West Midland Railway formed 1 July 1860, amalgamated with GWR 1 August 1863
    - Oxford, Worcester and Wolverhampton Railway opened at Worcester 5 October 1850, completed from Wolverhampton to Oxford in stages by April 1854
    - Newport, Abergavenny and Hereford Railway opened 2 January 1851
    - Worcester and Hereford Railway opened 25 July 1859
    - Severn Valley Railway opened 1 February 1862
  - Ely Valley Railway opened 1 August 1860

=== Midlands ===
- Manchester, Sheffield and Lincolnshire Railway, became Great Central Railway 1897)
  - Manchester, Sheffield and Lincolnshire Railway formed by an amalgamation of:
    - Sheffield, Ashton-under-Lyne and Manchester Railway
    - Sheffield and Lincolnshire Junction Railway
    - Great Grimsby and Sheffield Junction Railway
      - including Grimsby Docks Company
  - South Yorkshire Railway opened 9 September 1854, merged with GCR 1 August 1864
    - including southern part of Sheffield, Rotherham, Barnsley, Wakefield, Huddersfield and Goole Railway
  - Wigan Junction Railways
  - Wrexham, Mold and Connah's Quay Railway
  - North Wales and Liverpool Railway
  - Liverpool, St Helens and South Lancashire Railway
  - Lancashire, Derbyshire and East Coast Railway acquired in 1907
- Midland Railway formed 1844 by amalgamation:
  - North Midland Railway
  - Midland Counties Railway
  - Birmingham and Derby Junction Railway

Later acquired:

  - Leicester and Swannington Railway opened 14 July 1832
  - Sheffield and Rotherham Railway 1838
  - Birmingham and Gloucester Railway opened 17 December 1840
  - "Little" North Western Railway (Skipton – Lancaster) opened 1 June 1850
  - Manchester, Buxton, Matlock and Midlands Junction Railway
- North Staffordshire Railway incorporated in 1845 to promote three railway schemes. Three acts of Parliament on 26 June 1846 were given to the one company. Main line opened in 1848. Further acts were all granted to the NSR Co. which remained independent until the 1923 Grouping.

=== North ===
- Maryport and Carlisle Railway (first section) opened 1845. Remained independent until the 1923 Grouping
- Furness Railway (Furness) (first section) opened 11 August 1846
  - Ulverston and Lancaster Railway opened 1857 amalgamated with Furness in 1862
- Great Northern Railway incorporated 1846
  - Edgware, Highgate and London Railway incorporated 1862
- North Eastern Railway (NER) incorporated 1854
  - York, Newcastle and Berwick Railway was York and Newcastle Railway (1846–1847) and Newcastle and Darlington Junction Railway (1842–1846)
    - Durham Junction Railway incorporated 1834, amalgamated with N&DJR in 1844
    - Brandling Junction Railway incorporated 1836, amalgamated with N&DJR in 1845
    - Durham and Sunderland Railway incorporated 1834, amalgamated with N&DJR in 1846
    - Pontop and South Shields Railway incorporated 1842, amalgamated with N&DJR in 1846
      - Stanhope and Tyne Railway incorporated 1834, amalgamated with P&SSR in 1842
    - Newcastle and Berwick Railway incorporated 1845, amalgamated with Y&NR in 1847
      - Newcastle and North Shields Railway incorporated 1836, amalgamated with N&BR in 1845
    - Great North of England Railway incorporated 1836, amalgamated with YN&BR in 1850
  - York and North Midland Railway incorporated 1836
    - Leeds and Selby Railway incorporated 1830, amalgamated with Y&NMR in 1844
    - Whitby and Pickering Railway incorporated 1833, amalgamated with Y&NMR in 1845
    - East and West Yorkshire Junction Railway incorporated 1846, amalgamated with Y&NMR in 1852
  - Leeds Northern Railway was Leeds and Thirsk Railway (1845–1849)
  - Malton and Driffield Railway incorporated 1846
  - Deerness Valley Railway incorporated 1855, amalgamated with NER in 1857
  - Hartlepool Dock and Railway incorporated 1832, amalgamated with NER in 1857
  - North Yorkshire and Cleveland Railway incorporated 1854, amalgamated with NER in 1858
  - Bedale and Leyburn Railway incorporated 1853, amalgamated with NER in 1859
  - Hull and Holderness Railway incorporated 1853, amalgamated with NER in 1862
  - Newcastle and Carlisle Railway incorporated 1829, amalgamated with NER in 1862
    - Blaydon, Gateshead and Hebburn Railway incorporated 1834, amalgamated with N&CR in 1839
  - Stockton and Darlington Railway incorporated 1821, amalgamated with NER in 1863
    - Darlington and Barnard Castle Railway incorporated 1854, amalgamated with S&DR in 1858
    - Middlesbrough and Guisborough Railway incorporated 1852, amalgamated with S&DR in 1858
    - Middlesbrough and Redcar Railway incorporated 1845, amalgamated with S&DR in 1858
    - Wear Valley Railway incorporated 1845, amalgamated with S&DR in 1858
      - Bishop Auckland and Weardale Railway incorporated 1837, amalgamated with WVR in 1847
    - Eden Valley Railway incorporated 1858, amalgamated with S&DR in 1862
    - Frosterly and Stanhope Railway incorporated 1861, amalgamated with S&DR in 1862
    - South Durham and Lancashire Union Railway incorporated 1857, amalgamated with S&DR in 1862
  - Cleveland Railway incorporated 1858, amalgamated with NER in 1865
  - West Hartlepool Harbour and Railway incorporated 1852, amalgamated with NER in 1865
    - Clarence Railway incorporated 1828, amalgamated with WHH&R in 1853
    - Stockton and Hartlepool Railway incorporated 1839, amalgamated with WHH&R in 1853
  - Hull and Hornsea Railway incorporated 1862, amalgamated with NER in 1866
  - West Durham Railway incorporated 1839, amalgamated with NER in 1870
  - Hull and Selby Railway incorporated 1836, amalgamated with NER in 1872
  - Blyth and Tyne Railway incorporated 1852, amalgamated with NER in 1874
  - Hexham and Allendale Railway incorporated 1865, amalgamated with NER in 1876
  - Leeds, Castleford and Pontefract Junction Railway incorporated 1873, amalgamated with NER in 1876
  - Tees Valley Railway incorporated 1865, amalgamated with NER in 1882
  - Hylton, Southwick and Monkwearmouth Railway incorporated 1871, amalgamated with NER in 1883
  - Scotswood, Newburn and Wylam Railway incorporated 1871, amalgamated with NER in 1883
  - Whitby, Redcar and Middlesbrough Union Railway incorporated 1866, amalgamated with NER in 1889
  - Wear Valley Extension Railway incorporated 1892, amalgamated with NER in 1893
  - Scarborough & Whitby Railway incorporated 1871, amalgamated with NER in 1898
  - Cawood, Wistow and Selby Light Railway incorporated 1896, amalgamated with NER in 1900
  - Scarborough, Bridlington and West Riding Junction Railway incorporated 1885, amalgamated with NER in 1914
- Lancashire and Yorkshire Railway incorporated 1847. In 1846 the Liverpool and Bury Railway was amalgamated with the Manchester and Leeds Railway, which became known as The Lancashire and Yorkshire Railway in 1847
  - Manchester and Leeds Railway incorporated 1836
  - Manchester and Bolton Railway opened 1838
  - Ashton, Stalybridge and Liverpool Junction Railway 1844
  - Liverpool and Bury Railway 1845
  - East Lancashire Railway opened 1846: a section of this line is now a heritage railway
  - Wakefield, Pontefract and Goole Railway opened 1848
  - Liverpool, Crosby and Southport Railway opened 1848
- London and North Western Railway (LNWR) formed by amalgamation in 1846, there were 45 formerly independent railways within the LNWR, including:
  - Liverpool and Manchester Railway opened 15 September 1830
  - London and Birmingham Railway (first section) opened 20 July 1837; opened throughout 17 September 1838
  - Grand Junction Railway opened 1837
  - Chester and Crewe Railway opened 1846
  - Chester and Holyhead Railway opened 1848 to Bangor 1850 to Holyhead
  - Manchester and Birmingham Railway
  - Lancaster and Carlisle Railway
  - Cromford and High Peak Railway
  - Kendal and Windermere Railway
  - Watford and Rickmansworth Railway opened 1 October 1862 closed 1998 possible reopening (see Watford tube station)

=== South ===
- Isle of Wight Central Railway incorporated 1887, amalgamation of several smaller railways including:
  - Cowes and Newport Railway incorporated 1859
  - Ryde and Newport Railway opened 1875
  - Isle of Wight (Newport Junction) Railway completed 1879
- London Brighton and South Coast Railway amalgamation of five railways August 1846:
  - London and Croydon Railway incorporated 1835 opened 1839
  - London and Brighton Railway incorporated 1837 opened 21 September 1841
  - Croydon and Epsom Railway incorporated 1844.
  - Brighton and Chichester Railway incorporated 1844.
  - Brighton Lewes and Hastings Railway incorporated 1844.
  - West End of London and Crystal Palace Railway opened 1856–8.
- London, Chatham and Dover Railway
  - East Kent Railway incorporated 1853
  - Victoria Station and Pimlico Railway incorporated 1858.
  - Mid Kent Railway incorporated 1855.
- London and South Western Railway (LSWR)
  - London and Southampton Railway opened (first section) 21 May 1838; renamed LSWR 1838
  - Bodmin and Wadebridge Railway opened 23 May 1832, sold to LSWR autumn 1846 but not legally vested in that company until 1 July 1886
  - Richmond Railway opened 27 July 1846
  - Windsor, Staines and South Western Railway opened 1848–1849
  - Southampton and Dorchester Railway opened 1 June 1847; extended to Weymouth 20 June 1857
  - Staines, Wokingham and Woking Railway opened 1856
  - Andover and Redbridge Railway opened 6 March 1865, closed 1967
  - Lymington Railway opened 12 July 1858
- London, Tilbury and Southend Railway incorporated 1862 amalgamated with Midland Railway 1912
  - London and Blackwall Railway
- Metropolitan Railway (MetR)
  - North Metropolitan Railway incorporated 1853; became MetrR 1854. Other sections followed in 1860–70
- Midland and South Western Junction Railway: formed in 1884 by amalgamation of
  - Swindon, Marlborough and Andover Railway incorporated 1873
  - Swindon and Cheltenham Extension Railway incorporated 1881
- North London Railway incorporated 1846 original name:
  - East and West India Docks and Birmingham Junction Railway
- Pentewan Railway The railway from St Austell was complete by 22 June 1829 but not incorporated until 20 February 1873 as the Pentewan Railway and Harbour Company Limited. An act of Parliament on 7 August 1874 authorised the use of locomotives. It was closed from 4 March 1918.
- Redruth and Chasewater Railway This was opened on 30 January 1826 and was locomotive worked from 1 December 1864. It was closed from 27 September 1915.
- Somerset and Dorset Joint Railway (S&DJR). An amalgamation of the:
  - Somerset Central Railway, first section opened on 1 November 1860, and
  - Dorset Central Railway, first section opened on 28 August 1854.
  - The S&D Joint Railway was jointly operated by the Midland Railway and the London and South Western Railway (L&SWR). After the 1 January 1923 Grouping, joint ownership of the S&DJR passed to the LMS and the Southern Railway.
- South Eastern Railway incorporated 1836
  - London and Greenwich Railway
  - Canterbury and Whitstable Railway
  - Mid Kent Railway incorporated 1855.
  - Reading, Guildford and Reigate Railway
  - Victoria Station and Pimlico Railway incorporated 1858.
- Surrey Iron Railway (SIR) opened 1804 (4 ft gauge):
  - Croydon, Merstham and Godstone Railway – extension of SIR
- West Somerset Mineral Railway incorporated 1855 to carry iron ore; passenger service from 1865; closed to all traffic 1898 see article here

=== Wales ===
- Cambrian Railways incorporated between 1864 and 1904
  - Oswestry and Newtown Railway 30 miles: incorporated 6 June 1855; opened 1860–1
  - Llanidloes and Newtown Railway 12 1/4 miles: 4 August 1853; 1859. Until 1861 this section of the line was completely isolated
  - Newtown and Machynlleth Railway 23 miles: 27 July 1857; 1863
  - Oswestry, Ellesmere and Whitchurch Railway 18 miles: 1 August 1861; 1863–4
  - Aberystwith and Welsh Coast Railway 86 miles: 26 July 1861; 1863–69
  - Mid Wales Railway 45 1/2 miles: 1 August 1859; 1 September 1864. This railway maintained complete independence from the Cambrian until 1 January 1888, when the latter took over working the line; and on 1 July 1904 when the two railways amalgamated.
  - and several railways opened in the 1860s
- Festiniog Railway incorporated 23 May 1832 (1 ft 11 1/2 in (597 mm) gauge) 13 1/2 miles opened 1836 to carry dressed slate from Blaenau Ffestiniog to Porthmadog for export by sea, carried passengers from 1865. Still independent and since 1954 a leading heritage railway.
- Llanelly Railway and Dock Company incorporated 1828
- Rhymney Railway incorporated 1854
- Taff Vale Railway (TVR) incorporated 1836. Among the eight railways amalgamated with the TVR is one early railway:
  - Aberdare Railway opened 1846

== See also ==
- History of rail transport in Great Britain
  - History of rail transport in Great Britain to 1830
  - History of rail transport in Great Britain 1830–1922
