= Charleville Mansion, Shimla =

Colonial-era residence in India

Charleville Mansion

General information
- Status: Renovated; Private residence
- Type: Residential
- Architectural style: Victorian hill architecture
- Location: Shimla, Himachal Pradesh, India

Charleville Mansion is a colonial-era residence located in Shimla, Himachal Pradesh, India. It was constructed in 1913 and rented by British officer Victor Bayley, appointed Assistant Secretary of the Railway Board and posted to Shimla in the same year. The building is an example of late Victorian-era hill architecture in India. According to local historical accounts, the mansion is associated with legends of paranormal activity.

== History ==
Charleville Mansion dates to the British colonial period, though details of its original construction are not well documented. Some accounts suggest it was built in the late 19th century (soon after the Indian Rebellion of 1857). By the early 20th century it was used as a private residence. In October 1913, Victor Bayley, a British railway official who had just been appointed Assistant Secretary to the Railway Board in Shimla, and his wife took up residence at Charleville Mansion. Bayley’s family rented the house for the summer season of 1913, choosing it for its views and comparatively low rent (Shimla was the summer capital of India at that time). Legends hold that after a few months the couple abandoned the house. Times of India travel writing recounts that Bayley and his wife "had to vacate it when they realised it was haunted". The story goes that Bayley had heard rumors of a poltergeist in the house and decided to lock one upper room as a test. The next morning he found that room had been utterly destroyed and its contents scattered, with no explanation. Whether due to these frightening events or simply the end of the season, Bayley left Shimla later in 1913 and did not return. Thereafter, few people are recorded to have lived there for long periods; in subsequent decades it passed through private hands but remained largely vacant.

After Indian independence in 1947, ownership of Charleville Mansion passed out of British hands. In the mid-20th century it came under Indian private ownership, and for many years was left mostly unused and derelict. Local accounts and later travel write-ups indicate the property lay abandoned and fell into disrepair through much of the late 20th century. The exact history of its owners in the post-colonial era is not well documented in published sources. In recent years the mansion has been acquired by an Indian owner and reportedly renovated, though it remains largely closed to the public.

== Architecture and design ==
Charleville Mansion exemplifies the colonial "Victorian architecture" of summer cottages built in the Himalayas by British officials. The building is two stories tall, with broad verandahs and gabled roofs typical of hill station bungalows of the era. It stands set back from the main Shimla Ridge, surrounded by dense pine and oak woodland. The exterior walls are constructed of stone, and the roof is made of pitched corrugated sheet; ornamental elements of wood trim and columned porch reflect late-19th-century British design. Photographs show a symmetrical façade with shuttered windows and a central entrance verandah, giving it the appearance of a small castle or manor. Though its architectural details have suffered from years of neglect, the basic form – a compact two-level villa with a broad veranda remains intact. After its recent refurbishment, sources say the mansion has been restored largely in its original style.
