= History of rail transport in Great Britain 1923–1947 =

Rail transport in Great Britain between 1923 and 1947

The history of rail transport in Great Britain 1923–1947 covers the period when the British railway system was run by the Big Four group of companies – the London, Midland and Scottish Railway (LMS); the Great Western Railway (GWR); the London and North Eastern Railway (LNER); and the Southern Railway (SR). The period includes the investment following World War I; the rise in competition from the roads in the 1920s; development of steam locomotives capable of sustained 100 mph (160 km/h) running; the Great Depression of the 1930s; World War II and its aftermath; and the lead up to nationalisation during 1947.

During the First World War the railway network was taken under government control and run by the Railway Executive Committee of the Government. This revealed some advantages in running the railways with fewer companies, and after the war it was widely agreed that the required development of the rail network could not be achieved under the conditions that had existed before the war. The nationalization of the railways, which had been mooted by William Ewart Gladstone as early as the 1830s, was considered, but was rejected by the government and the owners of the rail companies. A compromise was created in the Railways Act 1921. Under this act, almost all of the hundreds of existing rail companies were grouped together into four new companies:

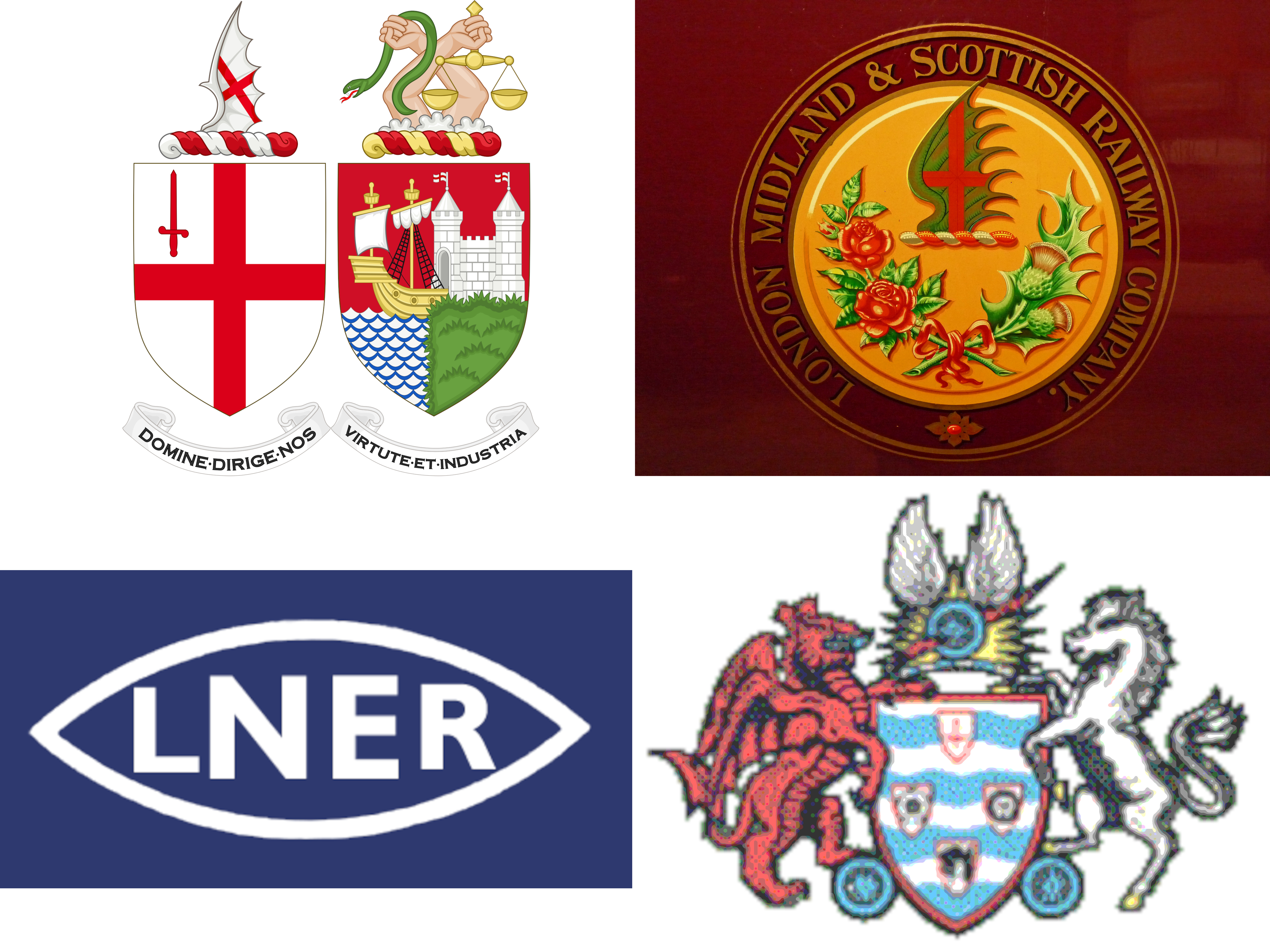
Big Four (British railway companies) clockwise GWR, LMS, SR and LNER

- London, Midland and Scottish Railway (LMS)
- Great Western Railway (GWR)
- London and North Eastern Railway (LNER)
- Southern Railway (SR)

This "grouping" had first been proposed in the 1850s, and lasted from 1 January 1923 to 31 December 1947. (See also List of railway companies involved in the 1923 grouping). Some lines remained outside this grouping, particularly those operated as Joint railways – such as the Midland and Great Northern Joint Railway and the Somerset and Dorset Joint Railway. The four companies were and are referred to as "The Big Four".

Although not in direct competition with each other over most of their routes, the Big Four competed to be the fastest, most modern and most comfortable, spurred on by increasing competition from road transport. Products of this competition were the LMS and LNER races to Scotland, with the Flying Scotsman service and LNER's Mallard setting a world speed record of 126 mph, the LMS's production of diesel railcars, electrification of lines by the LNER, the GWR's ingenious marketing and the SR's mass electrification scheme, which led to nearly the whole of the south east's trains being electric.

== Competition from the roads ==
Road transport grew rapidly during the 1920s, stimulated by the cheap sale of thousands of war-surplus vans and lorries and the subsidised construction of new roads, which was mainly funded by local authorities. The revenues of the railway companies suffered because of the loss of freight to road haulage in particular. This was largely because the Government would not release the railways from their obligations as 'common carriers', which had been brought in the 19th century. It obliged railway companies to carry any cargo offered to it at a nationally agreed charge, which was usually well below a rate necessary to make the operation profitable for the railways. The intention had been to stop railway companies "cherry picking" the most profitable freight whilst refusing to carry less profitable freight. This had been a necessary measure when railways had had an effective monopoly over land transport. But with road competition encroaching, it put the railways at a disadvantage, because they had to subsidise unprofitable freight operations with profitable ones, which drove up charges.

The road haulage operators, who had no such restrictions, could privately negotiate any rate they wished to undercut the railways' published price lists, and take away their business while offering door-to-door delivery. The railway companies had previously relied on horse-drawn trailers for local goods deliveries from the station; to compete they bought in motorised local delivery vehicles such as the Karrier 'Cob' and Scammell 'Mechanical Horse'. It was then thought that no large railway could operate at a profit unless more than half of its traffic was freight, and thus any reduction in the freight business would also affect the viability of the passenger business.

A Royal Commission on Road and Rail Transport in 1931 was ineffectual at producing a solution. However, the subsequent Salter Report of 1933 was adopted as government policy; the Ministry of Transport lifted some of the restrictions on the railways while introducing licensing and safety regulations on hauliers. Against a storm of protest, the Chancellor of the Exchequer, Neville Chamberlain, significantly increased vehicle excise duty so that all motor vehicles would pay the whole cost of the annual Road Fund.

However just as the campaign looked like being successful, World War II started. The common carrier requirement was lifted by Transport Act 1962.

== Changes and developments ==
With the transport policy pursued by the government, and more general changes in lifestyle favouring travel by road, the Big Four railways never ran a healthy profit. Indeed, the LNER never made a profit at all. However, they were still able to produce the world-leading services on the East Coast Main Line, running trains at speeds of up to 110 mph (180 km/h). Also the SR invested heavily in electrification of all its lines, and this electrification was done at a far faster rate than at any time under BR.

In the 16 years before the outbreak of World War II, the new companies set about the tremendous task of rebuilding railways which had had little or no work done since the end of World War I hostilities in 1918. Priority was new rolling stock: locomotives, coaches and wagons. As an example of the need for rationalisation, the LMSR took over 10,316 steam locomotives at the grouping: these comprised no fewer than 393 different classes.

In the 1920s, the companies produced some exceptional locomotives:

- LMSR: Royal Scot class 4-6-0 (1927); Sir Henry Fowler was Chief Mechanical Engineer (CME)
- LNER: A4 Pacific 4-6-2 (1935) (world steam speed record holder); A3 Pacific class 4-6-2 (1927); B17 Sandringham class 4-6-0 (1928); Sir Nigel Gresley CME
- GWR: Castle class 4-6-0 (1923); King class 4-6-0 (1927); Hall class 4-6-0 (1928): Charles B. Collett CME
- SR: King Arthur class 4-6-0 (1925); Lord Nelson class 4-6-0 (1926); R.E.L. Maunsell CME

In addition to those mainly passenger locomotives, many new classes of freight engines were produced: the pannier tank locomotives of the GWR and the Garratt heavy freight 2-6-0+0-6-2 locomotive of the LMS (although the latter were not a huge success and only a few were built) being two examples.

Total length of the British railways at 1 January 1923 was 19,585 route miles (31,336 km). With the rise in road traffic starting at the end of the 1920s, dozens of little-used branch lines began to close; some to passenger traffic, many completely.

Although few railways were constructed, some new works were undertaken. Among them were:

- Station redevelopments (notably those at Manchester and Paddington)
- Lines to allow easier running – one example being those on the Isle of Thanet
- The Southern Railway began a programme of main-line electrification, which was to bring fast services to many of the south coast resorts, and to extend the London suburban routes.

== World War II and its aftermath ==
During World War II the railway companies' managements joined, effectively becoming one company. The railways were used more heavily than at any time in their history during this period.

The railway system suffered heavy damage in some areas due to German Luftwaffe bombing, especially in cities such as London and Coventry. 482 locomotives, 13,314 passenger and 16,132 freight vehicles were damaged. However this damage was not as extensive as it was in many other European countries such as France and Germany. This unwittingly worked to the railways' disadvantage, because in other European countries the damage to their railway systems had been so bad that it gave them an opportunity to essentially re-build their railway systems from scratch, and dramatically modernise them.

During the war very little was invested in the railways and they became increasingly run-down. With only essential maintenance work being carried out during the war, the maintenance backlog increased even further. Rolling stock also began to deteriorate. After the war, it was clear that the rail network could not be maintained in the private sector. According to a calculation by the Central Statistical Office during the period 1938–1953 the railways suffered a net disinvestment of £440 million (around £11 billion in 2005 prices)

== The Big Four ==
=== London, Midland and Scottish Railway ===
The LMS claimed to be the world's largest joint stock organisation, the largest transport organisation, and the largest commercial undertaking in Europe (although they did not say on what basis), including the largest chain of hotels. In 1938, the LMS operated over 7,100 route miles (11,400 km) of railway across England, Wales, Scotland and Northern Ireland. However, it was not very profitable, with a rate of return of only 2.7%.

The principal LMS trunk routes were the West Coast Main Line and the Midland Main Line, which linked London, the industrial Midlands and North-West of England, and Scotland. The railway's main business was the transport of freight between these major industrial centres, rather than passengers.

The early history of the LMS was dominated by infighting between its two largest constituents, the Midland and the North Western, previously two fierce rivals. Generally, the Midland way prevailed, with the adoption of many Midland practices, such as the livery of crimson lake for passenger locomotives and rolling stock as well as the continuation of the Midland Railway's small engine policy. The arrival of the new Chief Mechanical Engineer William Stanier heralded a change in the LMS, introducing new ideas rather than continuing with the company's internal conflict.

=== London and North Eastern Railway ===
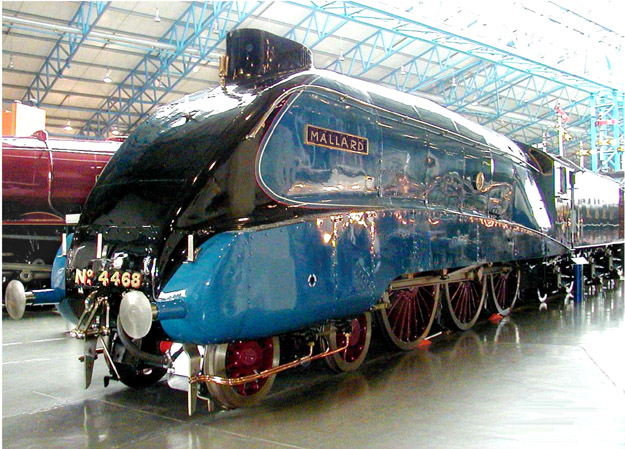
LNER number 4468 Mallard

The LNER covered the arc of the country between north and east of London. This included the East Coast Main Line from London to Edinburgh via York and Newcastle upon Tyne, as well as the routes from Edinburgh to Aberdeen and Inverness. It also included most of the country east of the Pennines, plus East Anglia. The total route mileage was 6,590 mi (10,610 km). The LNER's main workshops were in Doncaster.

The LNER hauled more than one-third of Britain's coal, and derived two-thirds of its income from freight services. Despite this, the main image that the LNER presented of itself was one of glamour, of fast trains and sophisticated destinations. The LNER's advertising campaign was sophisticated and advanced compared with those of its rivals. Top graphic designers and poster artists such as Tom Purvis were employed to promote its services and encourage the public to visit the holiday destinations of the east coast during the summer.

The first chief mechanical engineer of the LNER was Sir Nigel Gresley, who held the post for most of the LNER's life. He was noted for his "Big Engine" policy, and is best remembered for his large express passenger locomotives, many times the holder of the world speed record for steam locomotives. LNER Class A4 4-6-2 Pacific locomotive Mallard still holds the land speed record for a steam locomotive. Gresley died in office in 1941.

=== Great Western Railway ===
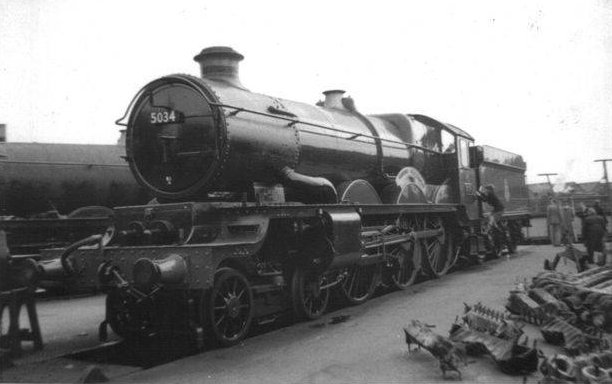
5034 Corfe Castle fresh from the Swindon works

The GWR was the only one of the big four to take its name from a predecessor. Its total route length was 3,800 mi (6,100 km), much of which had been built to handle the coal traffic from south Wales. Though this appeared to be a great coup for the GWR, the coal traffic declined significantly as the use of coal as a naval fuel declined, and within a decade the GWR was itself the largest single user of Welsh coal. The 1920s also saw the introduction of the GWR's most famous locomotives – the Castle and King classes developed by C. B. Collett. The 1930s brought hard times, and the records set by the Castles and Kings were surpassed by other companies, but the company remained in relatively good financial health despite the Depression.

In 1933, the Great Western Railway introduced the first of what was to become a successful series of railcars, which survived in regular use until they were replaced by British Railways in the 1960s. The original design featured 'air-smoothed' bodywork, which was very much the fashion at the time. The rounded lines of the first examples built lead to their nickname of "flying banana". Later examples had much more angular (and practical) bodywork, yet the nickname persisted for these too.

=== Southern Railway ===
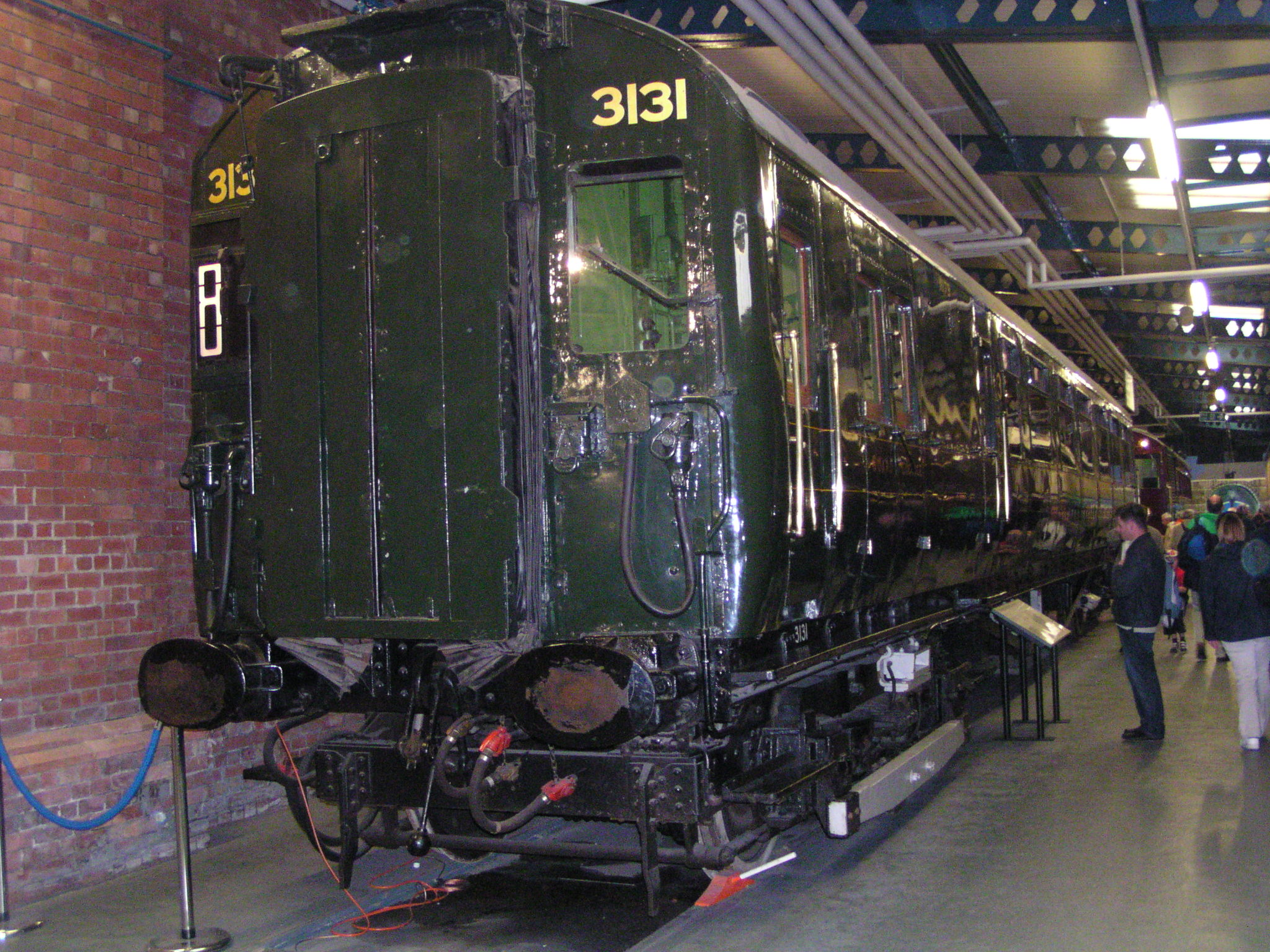
An SR EMU that ended up as a BR Class 404

The Southern Railway was geographically the smallest of the Big Four, and had 2,186 route miles (3,518 km). Confined to the south of England, it owned no track north of London. Unlike the rest of the Big Four, the Southern Railway was predominantly a passenger railway. Despite its small size it carried more than a quarter of the UK's total passenger traffic. This is because the area covered by the railway included many of the dense commuter lines around London, as well as serving some of the most densely populated parts of the country.

The Southern Railway was particularly successful at promoting itself to the public. "Sunny South Sam" became a character fixed firmly in the public mind as embodying the service of the railway, whilst slogans such as "live in Kent and be content" encouraged commuters to move out from London, and thus further patronise the services offered by the railway.

The Southern Railway had a strong commitment to electrification. The intensively used commuter system in a relatively small geographical area made the Southern a natural candidate for electrification. After the Grouping, the LSWR's 660 V DC third rail system was adopted for the whole region. LSWR metro area was initially electrified, soon followed by conversion LBSCR's 6.6 kV AC Overhead electrified London Metro lines and then the SECR's metro lines around London in the 1920s. The 1930s saw mainline electrification of the Brighton Main Line and the Portsmouth Direct Line with associated several surround lines (such as the East and West Coastways). Outer suburban electrification was also extensive (e.g. to Gillingham, Maidstone, etc.). Proposals to extend further to the Kent Coast were halted by World War II. Originally only electric multiple unit trains were used, but later electric locomotives and electro-diesel hybrids were developed.

During World War II, the Southern found itself at the front line. Before hostilities, 75% of SR traffic was passenger with just 25% being freight. During the war, roughly the same number of passengers was carried, but only made up 40% of total traffic – freight traffic had increased 4.5-fold. A shortage of freight locomotives was remedied by Chief Engineer Oliver Bulleid, who designed a 0-6-0 locomotive, the SR Q1 class. This was the largest 0-6-0 to operate in Britain, and forty of these transformed the Southern's ability to haul heavy freight.

== See also ==
- History of rail transport in Great Britain
