= John Armstrong (engineer) =

British civil engineer

John Armstrong (13 October 1775 – 17 March 1854) was a British civil engineer who worked on a number of canals, bridges and tunnels, mostly in Bristol and London. From 1831 to 1854 he was the City Surveyor for Bristol.

== Career ==
Armstrong was born in Ingram, Northumberland and, after receiving little formal education, became a millwright's apprentice in Bill Quay. In 1800 he moved to Bath and worked on several projects in the area, including the repairs to Pulteney Bridge and the construction of Bristol Harbour and Westgate Bridge. From 1821 he worked on projects in London and South East England such as Rochester Bridge and Grosvenor Canal. He was briefly the resident engineer for Marc Isambard Brunel's Thames Tunnel project but resigned due to poor health in August 1826, to be replaced by Isambard Kingdom Brunel. After his resignation he worked for Bramah and Co. at St Katharine Docks and managing property development. He joined the Institution of Civil Engineers on 11 March 1828. In 1831 he became Bristol City Surveyor, a position he held until his death on 17 March 1854.
