= Victoria Station and Pimlico Railway =

Early British railway company

Victoria Station and Pimlico Railway Act 1858
- Act of Parliament
- Parliament of the United Kingdom
- Long title: An Act to authorize the Construction of a Station near Victoria Street, Pimlico, in the County of Middlesex, and of a Railway to connect the same with the West London and Crystal Palace Railway at Battersea in the County of Surrey, in order to afford improved Communication between certain of the Railways South of the Thames and the Western Districts of the Metropolis; and for other Purposes.
- Citation: 21 & 22 Vict. c. cxviii

Dates
- Royal assent: 23 July 1858

The Victoria Station and Pimlico Railway (VS&PR) was an early British railway company which was incorporated by act of Parliament, the Victoria Station and Pimlico Railway Act 1858 (21 & 22 Vict. c. cxviii), on 23 July to build a railway line connecting the existing London, Brighton and South Coast Railway (LB&SCR) terminus in Battersea to a new terminal at London Victoria station in Westminster. This involved constructing the Grosvenor Bridge over the river Thames. The company later leased its lines and stations to the LB&SCR and the London Chatham and Dover Railway (LC&DR) but continued in existence until December 1922 when it was briefly amalgamated with the South Eastern Railway as a result of the Railways Act 1921, which created the Big Four on 1 January 1923.

== Origins ==
The railway was originally created to provide a West End of London terminus for the LB&SCR and three British railways which already had access to, or were planning to use the misnamed ‘Pimlico’ station of the LB&SCR, (which was actually sited in Battersea). These were the Great Western Railway (GWR), the London and North Western Railway (L&NWR), and the East Kent Railway, which would soon afterwards become the London Chatham and Dover Railway (LC&DR). The new company had an authorised capital of £1 million 45% of which was subscribed by LB&SCR. It was empowered to make agreements with the LC&DR and GWR, for these two companies to pay an agreed rent in perpetuity. The London, Brighton and South Coast Railway Company was to have custody and regulation of the line

Victoria Station and Pimlico Railway Act 1859
- Act of Parliament
- Parliament of the United Kingdom
- Long title: An Act to enable the Victoria Station and Pimlico Railway Company to raise further Sums of Money.
- Citation: 22 & 23 Vict. c. cxii

Dates
- Royal assent: 13 August 1859

Victoria Station and Pimlico Railway Act 1861
- Act of Parliament
- Parliament of the United Kingdom
- Long title: An Act to grant further Powers to the Victoria Station and Pimlico Railway Company, with reference to their Share and Loan Capital; and to sanction certain Agreements with the Great Western and London, Chatham, and Dover Railway Companies; and for other Purposes.
- Citation: 24 & 25 Vict. c. lxxxi

Dates
- Royal assent: 28 June 1861

Victoria Station and Pimlico Railway Act 1863
- Act of Parliament
- Parliament of the United Kingdom
- Long title: An Act to confer further Powers on the London Brighton, and South Coast Railway Company, with reference to the widening and Improvement of the Pimlico Railway; and for other Purposes.
- Citation: 26 & 27 Vict. c. ccxxvii

Dates
- Royal assent: 28 July 1863

Text of statute as originally enacted

The Victoria Station and Pimlico Railway Act 1859 (22 & 23 Vict. c. cxii) enabled the widening of the proposed lines and for the L&NWR and GWR to subscribe £100,000 each, towards the cost of construction.

== Completion ==
The line was completed and the LB&SCR side of Victoria station opened in the basin of the Grosvenor Canal on 1 October 1860, and leased to the LB&SCR which company had also promoted a bill enabling it to amalgamate with the VS&PR. However this was opposed by the GWR and LC&DR and rejected by Parliament. An agreement was made to widen the lines and bridges to separate the two main users, which was completed in 1862/3. The LC&DR and GWR station at Victoria (which also provided running powers for the L&NWR) was opened 25 August 1862

== Absorption ==
The VS&PR continued in existence until 14 December 1922 when it was absorbed by the South Eastern Railway as a result of the Railways Act 1921, prior to the creation of the Southern Railway on 1 January 1923.
