= History of rail transport in Great Britain to 1830 =

- 17th century – 1830
History of rail transport in Great Britain 1830–1922

The history of rail transport in Great Britain to 1830 covers the period up to the opening of the Liverpool and Manchester Railway, the world's first intercity passenger railway operated solely by steam locomotives. The earliest form of railways, horse-drawn wagonways, originated in Germany in the 16th century. Soon wagonways were also built in Britain. However, the first use of steam locomotives was in Wales. The invention of wrought iron rails, together with Richard Trevithick's pioneering steam locomotive meant that Britain had the first modern railways in the world.

== Early rails ==
A wagonway was used by German miners at Caldbeck, Cumbria, England, perhaps from the 1560s. A wagonway was built at Prescot, near Liverpool, sometime around 1600, possibly as early as 1594. Owned by Philip Layton, the line carried coal from a pit near Prescot Hall to a terminus about half a mile away.

Another wagonway was Sir Francis Willoughby's Wollaton Wagonway in Nottinghamshire built between 1603 and 1604 to carry coal.

As early as 1671 railed roads were in use in Durham to ease the conveyance of coal; the first of these was the Tanfield Wagon Way. Many of these tramroads or wagon ways were built in the 17th and 18th centuries. They used simple straight and parallel rails of timber on which carts with simple flanged iron wheels were drawn by horses, enabling several wagons to be moved simultaneously.

These primitive rails were superseded in 1767, when ironmaster Richard Reynolds probably for the first time replaced wooden rails with cast iron rails and in 1793 when the then superintendent of the Cromford Canal, Benjamin Outram, constructed a tramway with L-shaped flanged cast-iron plate rails from the quarry at Crich: it was a little over a mile in length descending some 300 feet (91 m) and had a gauge of 3 ft 6 in (1,067 mm). Wagons fitted with simple flange-less wheels were kept on the track by vertical ledges, or plates. Cast-iron rails were a significant improvement over wooden rails as they could support a greater weight and the friction between wheel and rail was lower, allowing longer trains to be moved by horses.

Outram's rails were superseded by William Jessop's cast iron edge rails where flanged wheels ran on the top edge of simple bar-shaped rails without the guiding ledges of Outram's flanged plate rails. The rails had been first employed in 1789 at Nanpantan at the Loughborough Charnwood Forest Canal. Such rails could be manufactured in 3 ft (914 mm) lengths. Jessop, a former pupil of John Smeaton, became a partner with Outram in 1790 in the latter's Butterley ironworks.

Cast iron rails had a propensity to break easily, and the short lengths soon became uneven. In 1820, John Birkenshaw introduced a method of rolling rails in greater lengths using wrought iron which was used from then onwards.

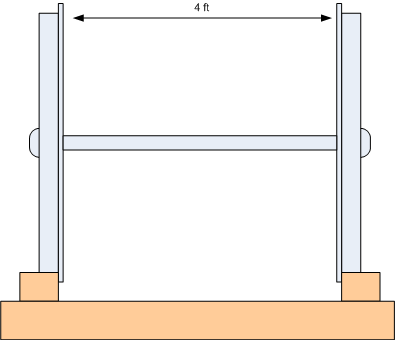
Cross-section diagram of Tanfield Wagon Way circa 1765 with wooden rails and cast iron flanged wheels

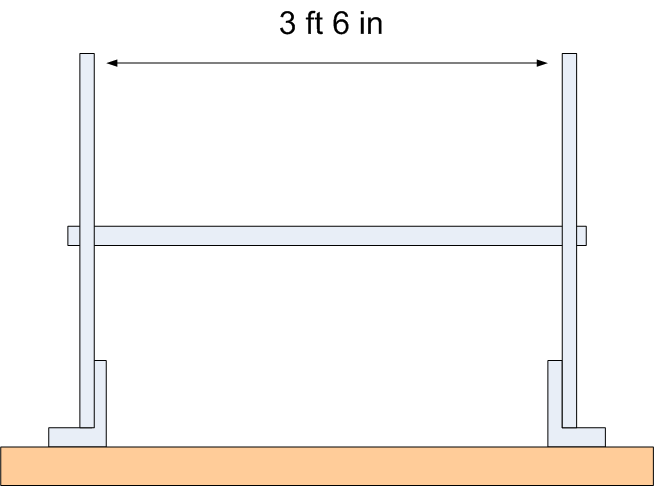
Cross-section diagram of Outram's Cromford Canal tramway showing cast-iron L-shaped flanged rails and flangeless iron wheels

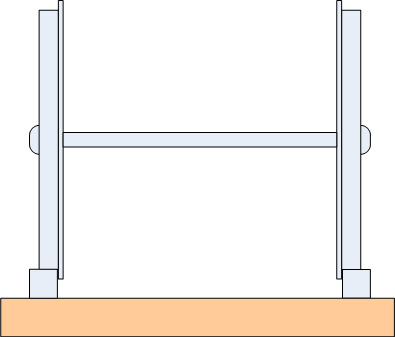
Jessop's edge rails of 1789 with cast-iron flanged wheels running on flangeless iron rails

== Early public railways ==
The earliest railways were built and paid for by the owners of the mines they served. As railway technology developed, longer lines became possible, connecting mines with more distant transshipment points and promising lower costs. These longer lines often required public subscription to build and crossed over land not owned by the mine owners. As a result, they needed an act of Parliament to build, to enforce the sale of way-leave by landowners. The acts also protected investors from unrealistic, or downright fraudulent, schemes.

The first line to obtain such an act, the Middleton Railway Act 1757 (31 Geo. 2 c. 22 Pr.), was a private coal-owner's wagonway, the Middleton Railway in Leeds. The first for public use, and on cast iron rails, was the Lake Lock Rail Road formed in 1796 and opened in 1798. Another early public railway, the Surrey Iron Railway obtained an act of Parliament, the Surrey Railways Act 1801 (41 Geo. 3. (U.K.) c. xxxiii), on 21 May 1801 to build a tram-road between Wandsworth and Croydon in what is now south London; the engineer was William Jessop. Although it survived only until 1845 and was for freight traffic only, it prefaced many others in different parts of the country. Meanwhile, the first passenger-carrying public railway was the Oystermouth Railway, authorised in 1807. All three of these railways were initially worked by horses; the Surrey Iron Railway remained horse-drawn throughout its life.

The Kilmarnock and Troon Railway was authorised by act of Parliament, the Kilmarnock and Troon Railway Act 1808 (48 Geo. 3. c. xlvi), on 27 May 1808 and was also built by William Jessop. It was the first line in Scotland to carry passengers. The line began life as a 4 ft (1,219 mm) gauge waggonway and at first it was operated by horses, but in 1817 locomotive haulage was trialled, using one of Stephenson's locomotives. This was the first use of a steam locomotive in Scotland.

== Introduction of steam locomotives ==
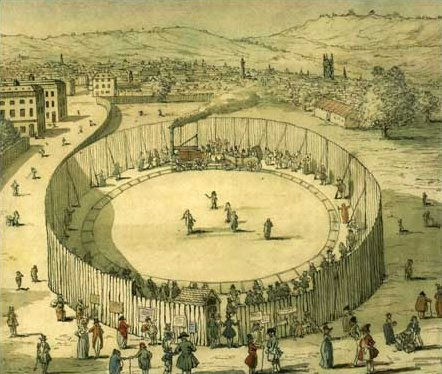
Trevithick's steam circus on which the locomotive Catch Me Who Can ran

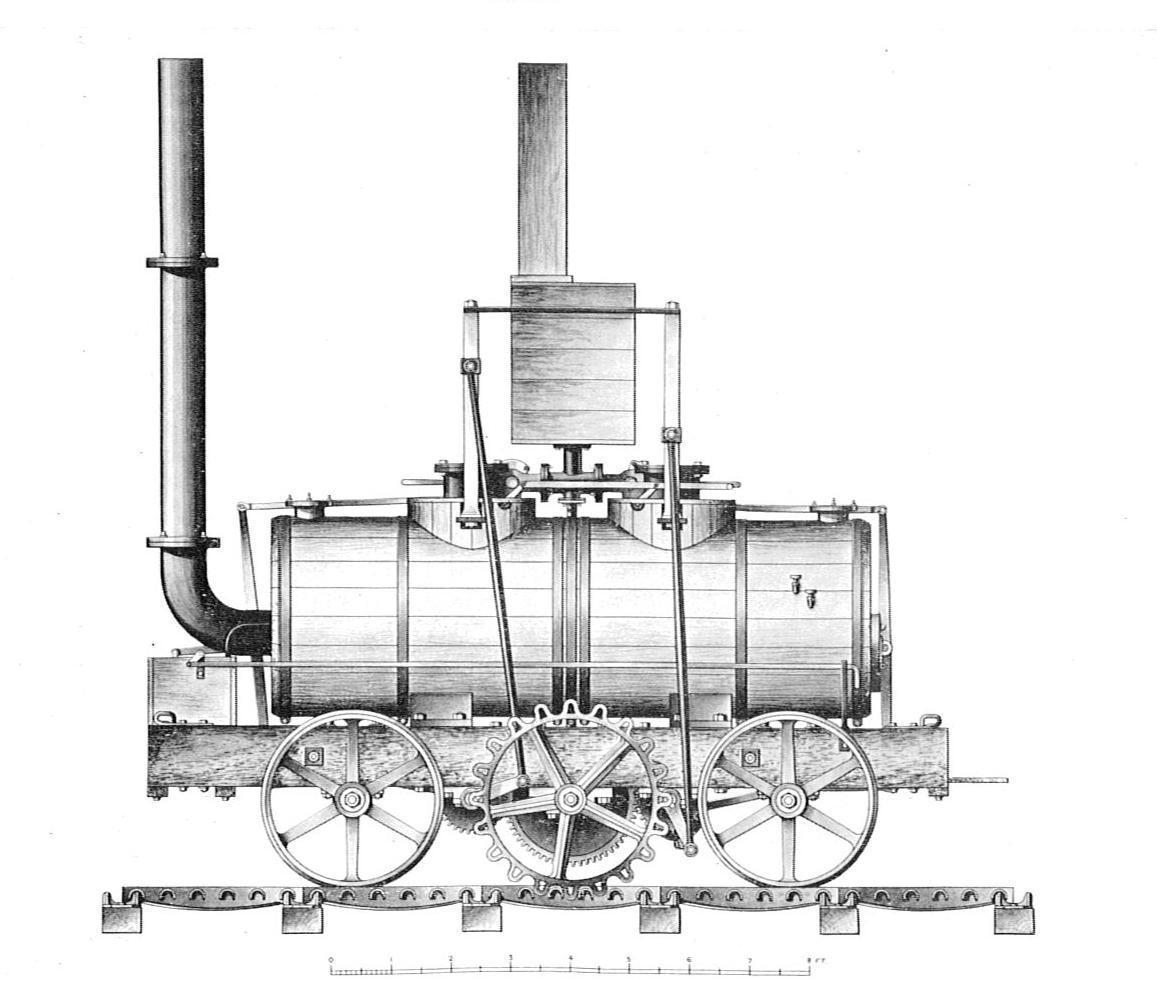
Salamanca

The first steam railway locomotive was introduced by Richard Trevithick in 1804. He was the first engineer to build a successful high-pressure stationary steam engine, in 1799. He followed this with a road going steam carriage in 1801. Although that experiment ended in failure, in 1802 the Coalbrookdale Company built a locomotive for him, but little is known about it, including whether or not it actually ran. In 1804, he built a successful unnamed rail going steam locomotive for the narrow gauge Merthyr Tramroad in South Wales (sometimes - but incorrectly - called the "Penydarren Tramroad"). The Penydarren locomotive used a high-pressure cylinder without a condenser, the exhaust steam being used to assist the draught via the firebox, increasing efficiency even more. These fundamental improvements in steam engine designs by Trevithick did not change for the whole of the steam era. Amid great interest from the public, on 21 February 1804 it successfully carried 10 tons of iron, 5 wagons and 70 men a distance of 9.75 miles (15.69 km) from Penydarren to Abercynon in 4 hours and 5 minutes, an average speed of nearly 5 mph (8.0 km/h). This locomotive proved that steam traction was a viable proposition, although the use of the locomotive was quickly abandoned as it was too heavy for the primitive plateway track. A second locomotive, built for the Wylam colliery, also broke the track.

Trevithick built a third locomotive in 1808, Catch Me Who Can, which ran on a temporary demonstration railway in Bloomsbury, London. Members of the public were able to ride behind at speeds up to 12 mph (19 km/h). However, it again broke the rails and Trevithick was forced to abandon the demonstration after just two months.

The first commercially successful steam locomotive was the twin cylinder Salamanca, built in 1812 by John Blenkinsop and Matthew Murray for the 4 ft 1 in (1,245 mm) gauge Middleton Railway. Blenkinsop believed that a locomotive light enough to move under its own power would be too light to generate sufficient adhesion, so he designed a rack and pinion system for the line. This was despite the fact that Trevithick had demonstrated successful adhesion locomotives a decade before. The single rack ran outside the narrow gauge edge-rail tracks and was engaged by a cog-wheel on the left side of the locomotive. The cog-wheel was driven by two cylinders embedded into the top of the centre-flue boiler. Four such locomotives were built for the railway, and they worked until the early 1830s.

== Stockton and Darlington Railway ==
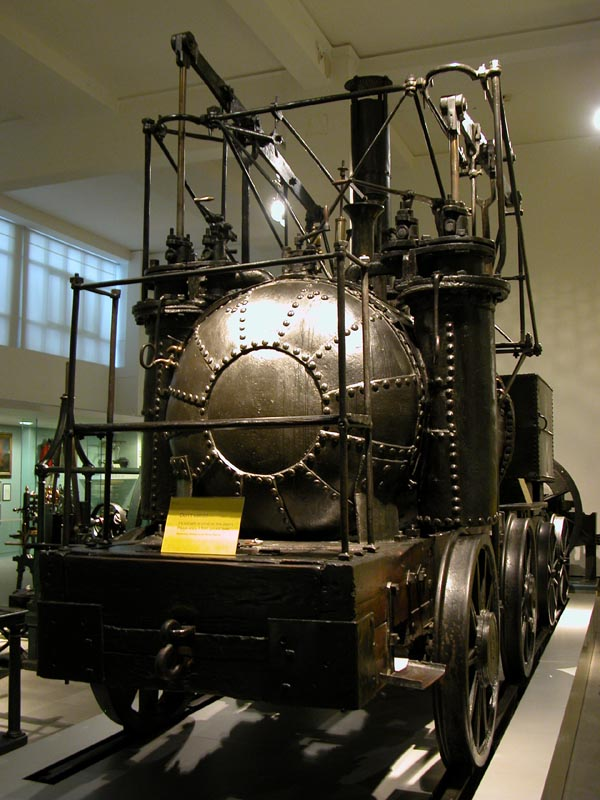
Puffing Billy

The proprietors of Wylam Colliery, near Newcastle upon Tyne wanted to replace horse-drawn trains with steam. In 1804, William Hedley, a manager at the colliery, employed Trevithick to build a steam locomotive. However, it proved too heavy for the wooden track to allow it to be used. William Hedley and Timothy Hackworth (another colliery employee) designed a locomotive in 1813 which became known as Puffing Billy. Puffing Billy featured piston rods extending upwards to pivoting beams, connected in turn by rods to a crankshaft beneath the frames, which in turn drove the gears attached to the wheels. This meant that the wheels were coupled, allowing better traction.

A year later George Stephenson, another of Wylam's employees, improved on that design with Blücher, which was the first locomotive to use flanged wheels to keep the locomotive on the track, and had cylinder rods directly connected to the wheels in the manner of Catch me who can.

In 1821 the Stockton and Darlington Railway Act 1821 (1 & 2 Geo. 4. c. xliv) was passed for a tramway between Stockton and Darlington. Stephenson's design convinced the backers of the proposed tramway to appoint Stephenson, who had recently built the Hetton colliery railway, as engineer. Traffic on the Stockton and Darlington Railway (S&DR) was originally intended to be horse-drawn, but Stephenson carried out a fresh survey of the route to allow steam haulage, and the Act was amended to allow the use of steam locomotives. The railway was also empowered to carry passengers in addition to coal and general merchandise.

The line was 25 miles (40 km) in length, had 100 passing loops along its single track, and four branch lines to collieries. It opened on 27 September 1825. The first train was hauled by Stephenson's Locomotion No 1 at speeds of 12 to 15 miles per hour (19 to 24 km/h). Four locomotives named Locomotion were constructed; they were effectively beam engines on wheels with vertical cylinders. They were also amongst the first locomotives to use coupling rods rather than chains to drive their wheels. The railway was initially operated like a public road, and it was a common occurrence for waggoners' trains to meet on the single track, leading to arguments as to who should back up to a passing loop.

== Monkland and Kirkintilloch Railway ==
The first public steam railway in Scotland was the Monkland and Kirkintilloch Railway. An act of Parliament authorising the railway was passed in 1824, and it opened in 1826 as a 4 ft 6 in (1,372 mm) gauge, Scotch gauge, railway.

== Liverpool and Manchester Railway ==
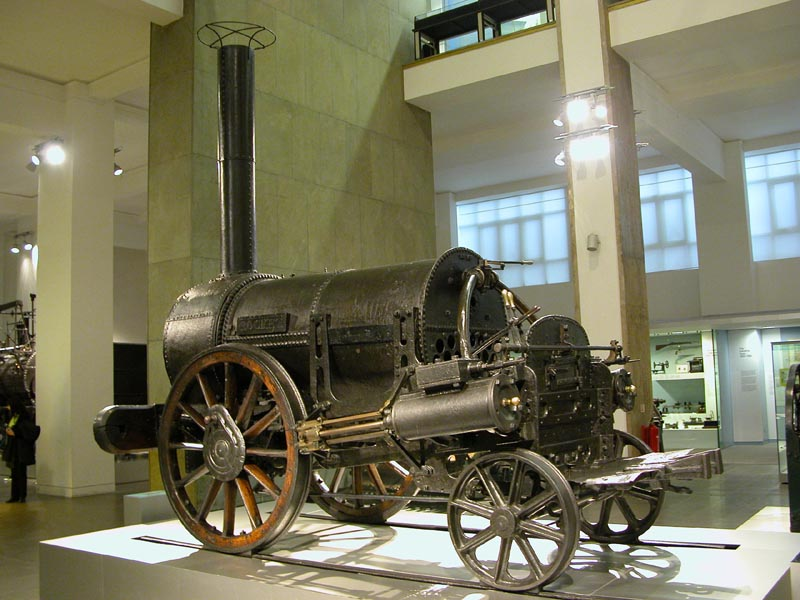
Stephenson's Rocket, preserved in the Science Museum, London

The Liverpool and Manchester Railway (L&MR) was the world's first intercity passenger railway in which all the trains were timetabled and operated by steam locomotives. This differed from the Stockton and Darlington, as sections of this line employed cable haulage, and only the coal trains were hauled by locomotives. Further, horse-drawn traffic could use the Stockton and Darlington upon payment of a toll. The passenger-carrying Canterbury and Whitstable Railway opened three months before the L&MR. However, it used cable haulage by stationary steam engines over much of its length, with steam locomotives restricted to the level stretch. The L&MR was primarily built to provide faster transport of raw materials and finished goods between the port of Liverpool and mills in Manchester in north-west England.

The Liverpool and Manchester Railway Company was founded on 24 May 1823. The 35-mile (56 km) line was a remarkable engineering achievement for its time, beginning with the 2,250-yard (2,060 m) Wapping Tunnel beneath Liverpool from the docks to Edge Hill. Following this was a two-mile (3.2 km) long cutting, up to 70 feet (21 m) deep, through rock at Olive Mount, and a nine 50-foot (15 m) span arch viaduct over the Sankey Brook Valley, around 70 feet (21 m) high. There was also a 4.75 miles (7.64 km) crossing of the Chat Moss bog.

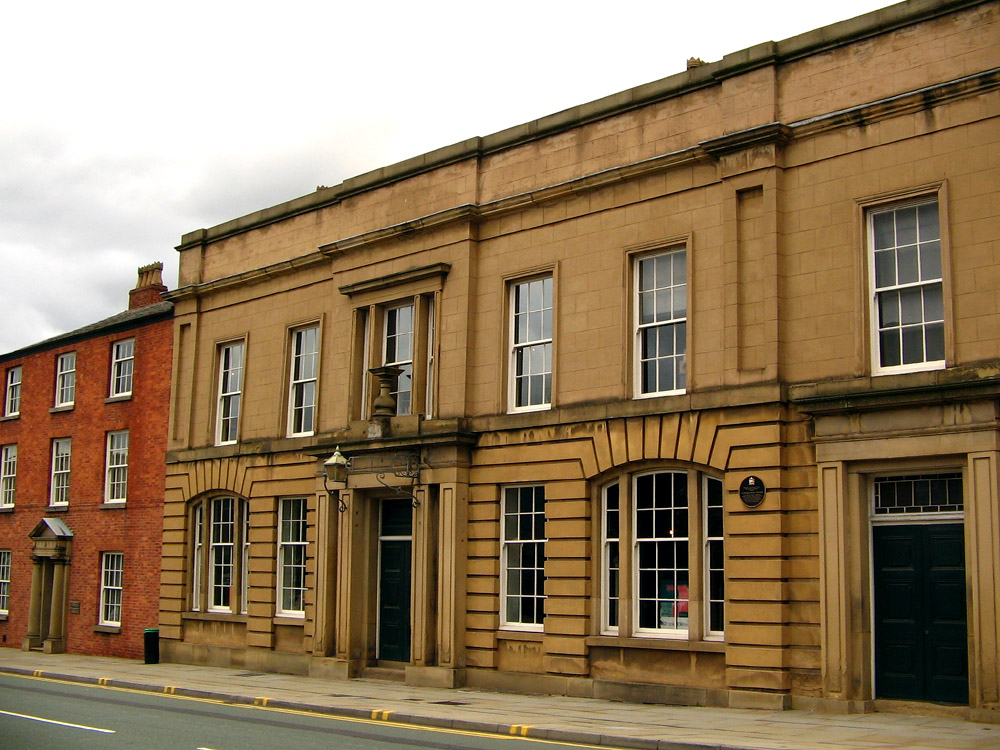
Liverpool Road Station in Manchester

To determine which locomotives would be suitable, the directors organised the Rainhill Trials. These were arranged as an open contest that would let them see all the locomotive candidates in action, with the choice to follow. A prize of £500 was offered to the winner of the trials. The trials were won by Rocket, built by George and Robert Stephenson. Rocket was the first locomotive to use a multi-tubular boiler, which allowed more effective heat transfer from the exhaust gases to the water. It was also the first to use a blastpipe, where used steam from the cylinders discharges into the smokebox beneath the chimney in order to increase the draught of the fire. With these innovations, Rocket averaged 12 miles per hour (19 km/h), with a top speed of 30 miles per hour (48 km/h) hauling 13 tons, and was declared the winner of the trials. The Stephensons were accordingly given the contract to produce locomotives for the Liverpool & Manchester Railway.

The line opened on 15 September 1830 with termini at Liverpool Road, Manchester (now part of the Museum of Science and Industry in Manchester) and Edge Hill, Liverpool.

== See also ==
- History of rail transport in Great Britain
- History of rail transport
- British narrow gauge railways
- Haytor Granite Tramway
- Little Eaton Gangway
