= Big Four (British railway companies) =

Largest railway companies in the UK in 1923–47

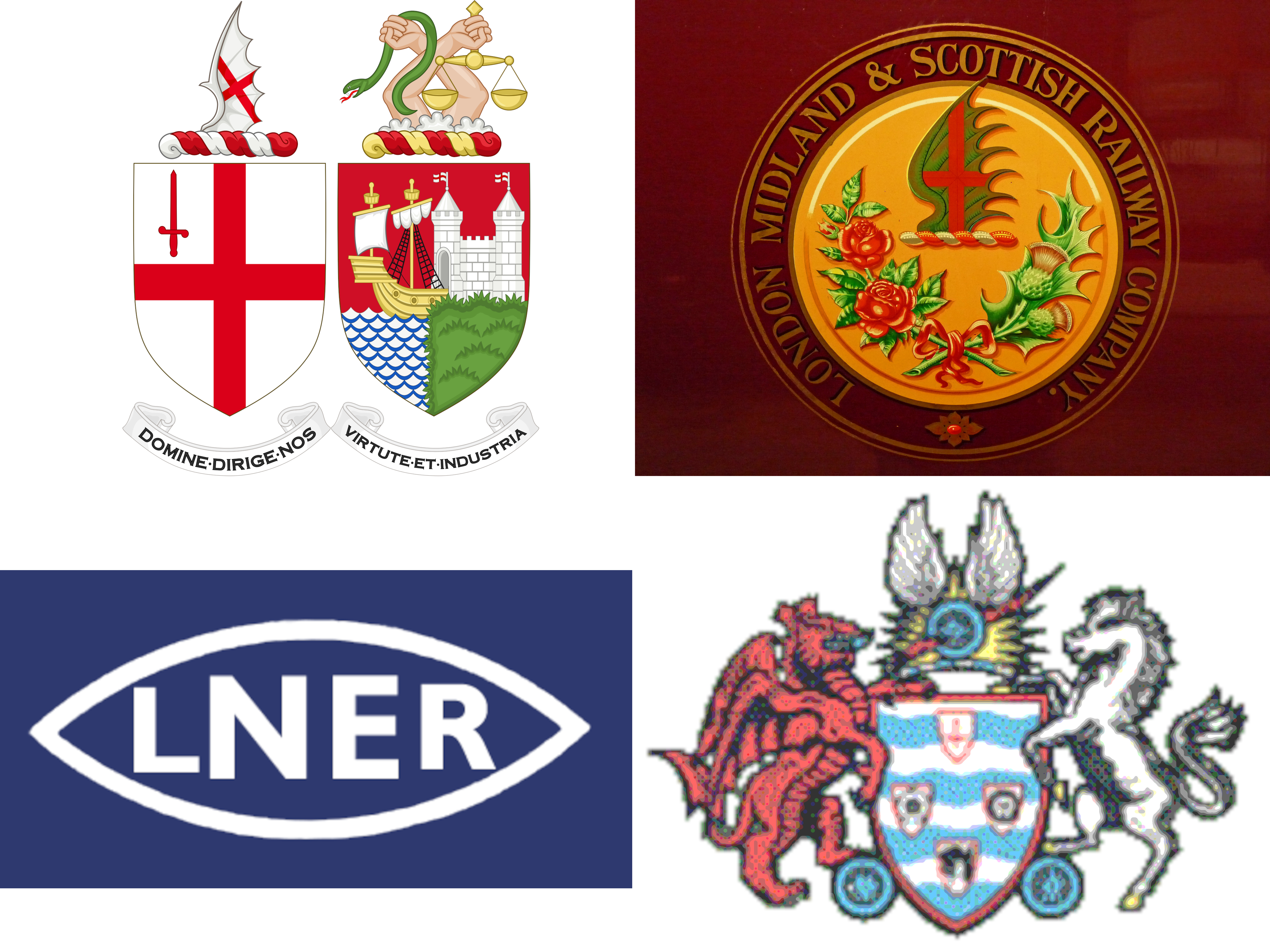
Big Four (British railway companies) clockwise, starting from the top left: GWR, LMS, SR and LNER

The "Big Four" was a name used to describe the four largest railway companies in the United Kingdom in the period 1923–1947. The name was coined by The Railway Magazine in its issue of February 1923: "The Big Four of the New Railway Era".

The Big Four were:

- Great Western Railway (GWR)
- London, Midland and Scottish Railway (LMS)
- London and North Eastern Railway (LNER)
- Southern Railway (SR)

The companies were formed as a result of the Railways Act 1921, in a process known as "The Grouping" (of the railways), which came into effect on 1 January 1923.

On 1 January 1948, the companies were nationalised to form British Railways as a result of the Transport Act 1947.

== Characterisation ==
The three larger companies relied heavily on freight (especially coal), as well as long-distance passenger traffic. The Southern Railway, in contrast, was predominantly a passenger railway, which, despite its small size, carried more than a quarter of the total UK passenger traffic. That was because the area it served included some of the most densely populated parts of the country and many of the well-patronised commuter lines radiating from London. It responded to that geography by pursuing a vigorous policy of electrification.

The GWR was the only company to retain its pre-grouping identity, which it duly imposed on all the railway companies it absorbed. However, the other three found that former influences remained strong. The Southern Railway's management remained decentralised, respecting the three distinct bundles of routes inherited from its constituents. The LMS struggled to reconcile different traditions, especially in locomotive engineering, only resolving that situation in 1932 with the appointment of Sir William Stanier, from the GWR, as chief mechanical engineer. The LNER never made a profit, a fact partly accounted for by having inherited the huge debts incurred by the Great Central Railway in building its extension to London.

== Joint activities ==
Although nominally in competition, the four companies worked together on projects of significance to the railway industry as a whole.

During World War II, the railway companies' managements were united, effectively becoming one company, under the direction of the Railway Executive Committee. The railways were hired by the Government from 1 January 1941, to continue for one year after the end of the war. In return, a fixed Annual Rent of £43,468,705 was payable, divided between the companies according to a set formula.

A commission was set up under the chairmanship of Sir Ernest Lemon to consider the post-war planning and reconstruction of the railways, with representatives of the Big Four and the London Passenger Transport Board.

=== Joint lines ===
Each company operated a number of lines jointly with one or more of the others, a situation which arose when the former joint owners of a route were placed into different post-grouping companies. Most of these were situated at or near the boundaries between two or more of the companies; however there were some notable examples which extended beyond this hinterland zone.

The number of jointly operated lines was greatly reduced by the grouping but a substantial number survived, including the Cheshire Lines Committee, the Forth Bridge Railway, the Midland and Great Northern Joint Railway (all LMS/LNER) and the Somerset and Dorset Joint Railway (LMS/SR). At in excess of 180 track miles, the M&GN was the largest jointly operated network in Great Britain, and extended from Peterborough to the East Anglian coast. It was wholly incorporated into the LNER in 1936. The S&D connected Bath and Bournemouth, and wound its way through territory otherwise dominated by the GWR. The LMS was responsible for its locomotives and the Southern for the infrastructure. Initially, the S&D had its own locomotives but these were absorbed into LMS stock in 1930. Further simplification of the railway map, long advocated, was not achieved until nationalisation. One joint operation, the Fishguard & Rosslare Railways & Harbours Company, which Irish independence had rendered international, survives to this day.

=== Road transport ===
The Big Four inherited and developed networks of feeder bus services, and after 1928 began to acquire majority shareholdings in local bus companies, such as the Bristol Tramways and Carriage Company, Crosville and United Automobile Services. However, railway involvement in bus operations was transformed in the period 1928–30. The companies’ legal powers to run bus services were unclear and each promoted private legislation (the Road Powers Acts of 1928) to obtain clarity. Concessions were demanded in return, including the key one that the railways would refrain from taking a controlling interest in bus undertakings. This led the companies to enter into partnerships with the bus combines: British Electric Traction, Scottish Motor Traction and Thomas Tilling, also the National Omnibus and Transport Company, soon afterwards absorbed by Tilling. The railways relinquished the majority stakes they had already acquired but also bought substantial minority shareholdings in other companies in the combine groups. Eventually there were investments in 33 bus and coach companies.

Where there was a local monopoly of rail services the agreements were bilateral but where inter-penetrating lines were common, there were two railway companies with minority shareholdings, for example, Devon General and Thames Valley Traction (both GWR/SR), Crosville and Midland Red (both GWR/LMS), and Eastern Counties, Eastern National, East Midland Motor Services, Hebble Motor Services, Lincolnshire Road Car, Trent Motor Traction, West Yorkshire Road Car, Yorkshire Traction and Yorkshire Woollen District Transport (all LMS/LNER). The LMS and LNER also sat with the local authority on Joint Omnibus Committees in Halifax and Sheffield.

In October 1933, the railways jointly purchased the Hay's Wharf Cartage Company Ltd., owners of Pickfords, and Carter Paterson.

=== Other activities ===
Air services were another area of co-operation. The GWR, LMS and Southern acquired British and Foreign Aviation, Ltd. and formed Railway Air Services Ltd. Channel Island Airways, Ltd. and its subsidiaries (Jersey Airways, Ltd. and Guernsey Airways, Ltd.) were wholly owned by the GWR and Southern.

Thomas Cook & Son having come into Belgian ownership, its impounded shares were sold by the British Custodian of Enemy Property to the Big Four.

== Continuity ==
The areas served by the Big Four formed the basis of the British Railways regions as follows:

- The GWR became the Western Region
- The English and Welsh parts of the LMS became the London Midland Region
- The North Eastern Area of the LNER became the North Eastern Region
- The remainder of the English part of the LNER (its Southern Area) became the Eastern Region
- The SR became the Southern Region
- The LMS and LNER in Scotland were united as the Scottish Region
- The LMS-owned Northern Counties Committee in Northern Ireland was transferred to the newly created Ulster Transport Authority. Northern Ireland's rail network has remained separate from Great Britain's since.

The regions — whose powers were greatly enhanced during the 1950s under the Area Railways Boards — ceased to be operational units following sectorisation during the 1980s and were finally abolished in the run-up to privatisation in 1992.

== See also ==
- History of rail transport in Great Britain
- History of rail transport in Great Britain 1830–1922
- History of rail transport in Great Britain 1923–1947
- List of railway companies involved in the 1923 grouping
- Railways Act 1921
- Transport Act 1947
- British Transport Commission
