= Railway Mania =

Speculative frenzy in the UK in the 1840s about railways

A painting of the inaugural journey of the Liverpool and Manchester Railway, by A. B. Clayton

Railway Mania was a stock market bubble in the railway industry of the United Kingdom of Great Britain and Ireland in the 1840s. It followed a common pattern: as the price of railway shares increased, speculators invested more money, which further increased the price of railway shares, until the share price collapsed. The mania reached its zenith in 1846, when 263 Acts of Parliament for setting up new railway companies were passed, with the proposed routes totalling 9,500 miles (15,300 km). About a third of the railways authorised were never built—the companies either collapsed because of poor financial planning, were bought out by larger competitors before they could build their line, or turned out to be fraudulent enterprises to channel investors' money into other businesses.

== Causes ==
The world's first recognizably modern inter-city railway, the Liverpool and Manchester Railway (the L&M), opened in 1830 and proved to be successful for transporting both passengers and freight. In the late 1830s and early 1840s, the British economy slowed. Interest rates rose, making it more attractive to invest money in government bonds—the main source of investment at the time—and political and social unrest deterred banks and businesses from investing the huge sums of money required to build railways; the L&M cost £637,000(£62,910,000 adjusted for 2025).

By the mid-1840s, the economy was improving and the manufacturing industries were once again growing. The Bank of England cut interest rates, making government bonds less attractive investments, and existing railway companies' shares began to boom as they moved ever-increasing amounts of cargo and people, making people willing to invest in new railways.

In 1825 the government had repealed the Bubble Act, which had put close limits on the formation of new business ventures and restricted joint stock companies. Shares were promoted and could be purchased for a 10% deposit. Many lost heavily.

The British government promoted a laissez-faire system of low regulation for the railways. Companies had to submit a bill to Parliament to gain the right to acquire land for the line, which required the route of the proposed railway to be approved, but there were no limits on the number of companies and no real checks on the financial viability of a line. Anyone could form a company, gain investment and submit a bill to Parliament. Many Members of Parliament were heavy investors in such schemes.

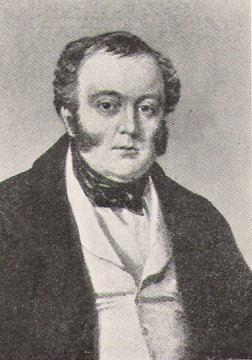
George Hudson

Magnates like George Hudson developed routes in the North and Midlands by amalgamating small railway companies and rationalising routes. He was also an MP, but ultimately failed because of his fraudulent practices of, for example, paying dividends from capital.

== The end of the mania ==
As with other bubbles, the Railway Mania became a self-promoting cycle based purely on over-optimistic speculation. As the dozens of companies formed began to operate and the simple unviability of many of them became clear, investors began to realise that railways were not all as lucrative and as easy to build as they had been led to believe. Coupled to this, in late 1845 the Bank of England increased interest rates. As banks began to re-invest in bonds, the money began to flow out of railways, undercutting the boom.

The share prices of railways slowed in their rise, then leveled out. As they began to fall, investment stopped virtually overnight, leaving numerous companies without funding and numerous investors with no prospect of any return on their investment. The larger railway companies such as the Great Western Railway and the nascent Midland began to buy up strategic failed lines to expand their network. These lines could be purchased at a fraction of their real value as given a choice between a below-value offer for their shares or the total loss of their investment, shareholders naturally chose the former. Many middle-class families on modest incomes had sunk their entire savings into new companies during the mania, and they lost everything when the speculation collapsed.

The boom-and-bust cycle of early-industrial Britain was still in effect, and the boom that had created the conditions for Railway Mania began to cool and then a decline set in. The number of new railway companies fell away to almost nothing in the late 1840s and early 1850s, with the only new lines constructed being by the large companies. Economic upturns in the 1850s and 1860s saw smaller booms in railway construction, but these never reached anywhere near the scale of the mania—partly because of more thoughtful (if still very limited) government control, partly because of more cautious investors and partly because the UK railway network was approaching maturity, with none of the 'blank canvas' available to numerous companies as in the 1840s.

== Results ==
Unlike some stock market bubbles, there was a net tangible result from all the investment: a vast expansion of the British railway system, though perhaps at an inflated cost. Amongst the high number of impractical, overambitious and downright fraudulent schemes promoted during the mania were a good number of practical trunk routes (most notably the initial part of the Great Northern Railway and the trans-Pennine Woodhead route) and important freight lines (such as large parts of what would become the North Eastern Railway). These projects all required vast amounts of capital, all of which had to be raised from private enterprise. The speculative frenzy of the mania made people much more willing to invest the large sums required for railway construction than they had been previously or would be in later years. Even many of the routes that failed when the mania collapsed became viable (if not lucrative) when each was in the hands of the larger company that had purchased it. A total of 6,220 miles (10,010 km) of railway line were built as a result of projects authorised between 1844 and 1846—by comparison, the total route mileage of the modern UK railway network is around 11,000 miles (18,000 km).

== Comparisons ==
Railway and Canal Mania can be compared with a similar mania in the 1990s in the stock of telecom companies. The telecom mania resulted in the installation and deployment of a vast amount of fibre-optic telecommunications infrastructure, spurred on from the realisation that the same railway rights-of-way could make affordable conduits for fibre optics. Yet another boom occurred in the period 1995–2000, during the development of the Internet, when many companies were established to promote new services on the growing network. The dot-com bubble collapsed in 2000, and the much more extensive telecoms bubble in 2002 with the bankruptcies of Enron, WorldCom, Global Crossing and QWest, although some platform companies such as Google and Amazon grew and prospered, diversifying into backbone fibre networks and cloud computing services. In 2025, comparisons were made to investment in artificial intelligence, with parallels being drawn between railways and AI data centres, though the level of economic concentration was greater in railways due to the less-developed market of the time.

== See also ==
- History of rail transport in Great Britain
- List of early British railway companies
- Balloonomania
- Bike boom
- Timeline of transportation technology

== Bibliography ==
- Wolmar, C, 2007, Fire & Steam: A History of the Railways in Britain, Atlantic Book (London) ISBN 978-1-84354-629-0
