= Joint railway =

Railway operating under multiple companies

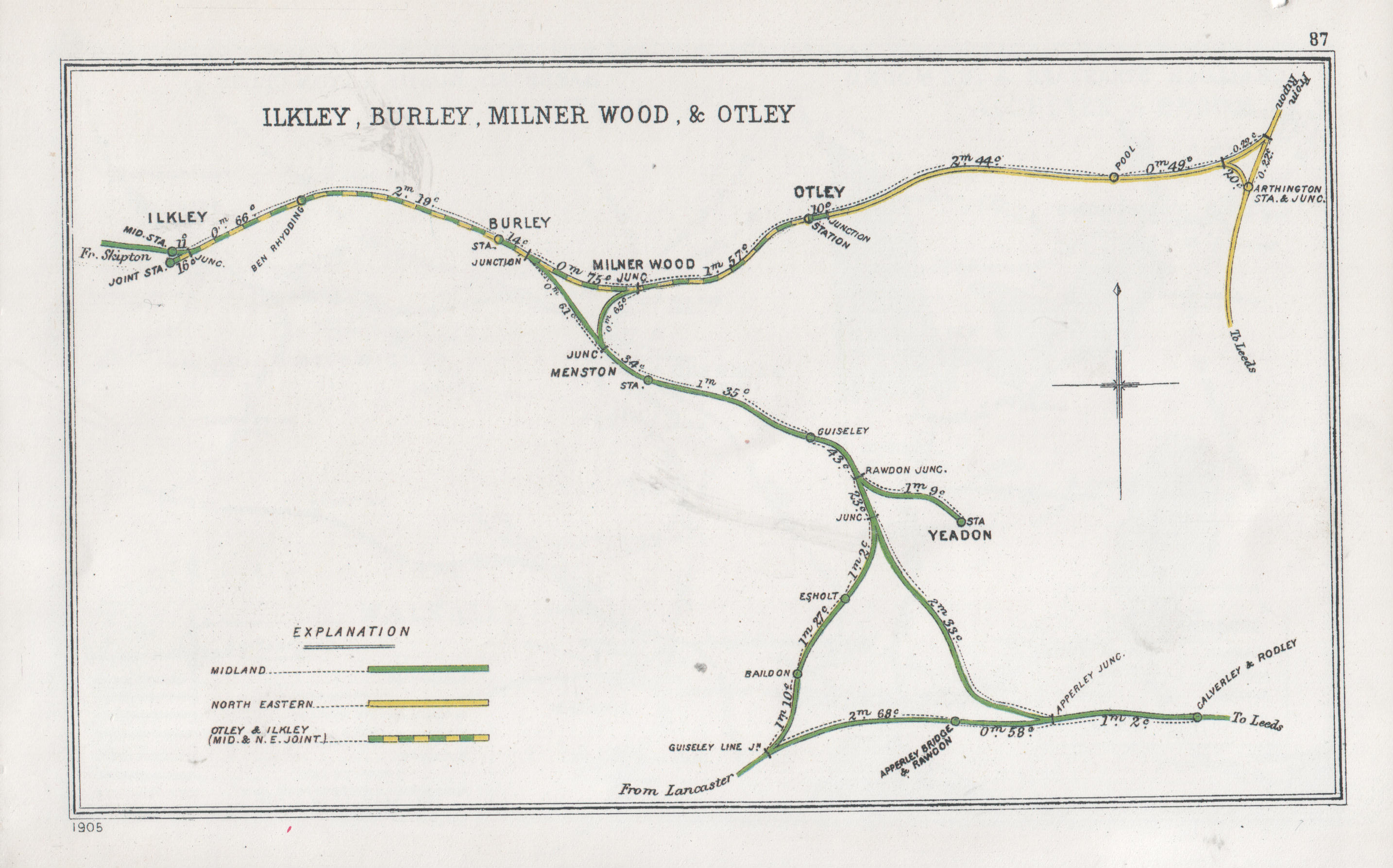
A diagram showing railways near Ilkley, West Yorkshire, including a joint railway

A joint railway is a railway operating under the control of more than one railway company.

== United Kingdom ==
There are many examples of joint railways in the United Kingdom. These include:

- Midland and Great Northern Joint Railway (M&GN): Midland Railway (MR) and Great Northern Railway (GNR), latterly London and North Eastern Railway (LNER) and London, Midland and Scottish Railway (LMS). This was the UK's biggest joint railway system at 183 miles (295 km) and operated with its own locomotives and rolling stock. The system stretched mainly east-west from Great Yarmouth via South Lynn to Bourne and Peterborough and thence via the parent companies' systems to Leicester and the Midlands and to London King's Cross. A north-south route ran from Norwich City to Cromer. The two routes crossed at Melton Constable, the joint railway's main engineering centre.
- Cheshire Lines Committee: Great Northern, Great Central and Midland railways (GNR/GCR/MR), 140 miles (230 km) operated with its own rolling stock.
- Great Northern and Great Eastern Joint Railway: the Great Northern and Great Eastern railways. From Huntingdon and Spalding to Doncaster, with a branch to Ramsey. 123 miles (198 km)
- Somerset and Dorset Joint Railway: London and South Western Railway (LSWR) and Midland Railway. 101 miles (163 km) operated, with its own locomotives and rolling stock until 1930.
- East London Railway: the Great Eastern, London, Brighton and South Coast, South Eastern and Chatham, Metropolitan and District railways (GER/LBSCR/SE&CR/MetR/District) 7 miles (11 km)
- Metropolitan and Great Central Joint Committee: the Metropolitan and Great Central railways
- Manchester South Junction and Altrincham Railway: LNWR/GCR. 9 miles (14 km). Electrified in 1931
- Portpatrick and Wigtownshire Joint Railway: the Caledonian, Glasgow and South Western, London and North Western and Midland railways. 82 miles (132 km)
- Preston and Wyre Joint Railway: L&YR/LNWR. 45 miles (72 km)
- Great Western and Great Central Railways Joint Committee: the Great Western and Great Central railways. 41 miles (66 km)
- Severn and Wye Joint Railway: Great Western Railway and Midland Railway. 39 miles (63 km)
- Shrewsbury and Hereford Railway: the Great Western and London and North Western railways. 56 miles (90 km)
- Shrewsbury and Wellington Railway: the Great Western and London and North Western railways. 10.5 miles (16.9 km)
- South Yorkshire Joint Railway: GCR/GNR/L&YR/MR/NER. 20 miles (32 km)
- Furness and Midland Joint Railway: 9 1/2 miles (15.3 km)
- Metropolitan and Metropolitan District Joint Committee: Metropolitan and Metropolitan District Railway, Mansion House to Aldgate on the Circle Line. 1 mile (1.6 km)
- Norfolk and Suffolk Joint Railway (N&S): the Midland and Great Northern and the Great Eastern Railway). There were two stretches of line: the most important ran along the East Anglian coast from Lowestoft to Yarmouth, while a much shorter stretch ran from Cromer to Mundesley on the North Norfolk coast. This line was a unique joint railway in that one of its parents was itself a joint railway.
- Axholme Joint Railway : North Eastern and Lancashire and Yorkshire railways (NER/L&YR) 27.5 miles (44.3 km)
- Forth Bridge Railway: the North British, Great Northern, North Eastern and Midland railways. 2,765 yd (2,528 m)
- County Donegal Railways Joint Committee: the Northern Counties Committee and Great Northern Railway (Ireland). 111 miles (179 km) of 3 ft (914 mm) narrow gauge track in Northern Ireland and the Republic of Ireland, with its own locomotives and rolling stock.

== United States ==
Most joint railways in the United States have historically been terminal railroads, which have typically been formed and co-owned by several connecting railroads serving a major urban center to reduce the need for redundant right of way and expensive infrastructure such as tunnels or bridges. Terminal railroads have often incorporated a union station, allowing for more convenient connecting service for passengers, particularly in the era before Amtrak when passengers may have needed to switch from one company's train to another to reach their ultimate destination.

Prominent joint operations in the U.S. include:

- Belt Railway of Chicago (BRC), the largest terminal switching railroad in the U.S., co-owned by all the "Big Six" American Class I railroads: Union Pacific (UP), CSX, Norfolk Southern, BNSF, Canadian National and CPKC.
- Terminal Railroad Association of St. Louis (TRRA), with extensive operations in East St. Louis, Illinois and St. Louis, Missouri, and co-owned by all the Big Six except the Canadian Pacific.
- Conrail Shared Assets Operations (CSAO), the last corporate remnant of Conrail, which was formed from the remains of several bankrupt railroads in 1976; that company was split between CSX and Norfolk Southern, which formed CSAO in northern New Jersey, greater Philadelphia, Pennsylvania and greater Detroit, Michigan. Unlike the BRC and TRRA, CSAO uses crews and locomotives from its two parent companies, though the former Conrail paint scheme is still seen on numerous locomotives and freight cars that CSX and NS inherited.
- The Powder River basin joint line, co-owned by BNSF and UP to serve the area's numerous coal mines.
- The Burlington-Rock Island Railroad (B-RI), 303 miles (488 km) from Cleburne, Texas, to Teague, Texas, jointly owned and operated by the Chicago, Rock Island and Pacific (CRI&P) and the Chicago, Burlington and Quincy (CB&Q). The B-RI was absorbed by Burlington Northern (successor of the CB&Q) after the CRI&P was liquidated in 1980, and is today operated by BNSF.

The concept of trackage rights is more common than joint railways in the United States. The railroad that owns the track permits trains from another railroad to use the line. The owner railroad normally charges a fee, but sometimes there is no charge because the arrangement results from a merger or sale of a line. For instance, when the Louisville and Nashville Railroad acquired the Monon Railroad a condition of the sale imposed by government regulators was a trackage rights arrangement over the southern part of the Monon for the Milwaukee Road, an agreement that was handed down to successive owners of the Milwaukee Road and finally the Indiana Rail Road.

Variations on trackage rights include "direction running" agreements between two railroads with parallel lines through an area, usually done to facilitate greater traffic volume. For instance, CSX and NS have a directional-running agreement between downtown Cincinnati, Ohio and nearby Hamilton, where northbound trains generally use NS trackage and southbound trains (with the exception of Amtrak's Cardinal) use CSX tracks. North of Hamilton, NS trains use CSX tracks on a traditional trackage-rights agreement for a two-mile (3 km) section. Another prominent example is the Colorado Joint Line between Denver and Pueblo, which originally consisted of a line owned by the Denver and Rio Grande Western and a parallel line owned by the Atchison, Topeka and Santa Fe and shared by the CB&Q under trackage rights. During World War I, the United States Railroad Administration operated the two lines as a bidirectional double-track railroad; after control of the U.S. rail system reverted to private companies following the war, the three railroads continued the bidirectional arrangement, and it continues today under BNSF and UP, the successors to the original companies.

== Bibliography ==
- Casserley, H. C. (1968). Britain's Joint Lines. Ian Allan. ISBN 0-7110-0024-7

== See also ==
- List of early British railway companies
- List of railway companies involved in the 1923 grouping
- Joint station (UK), Union station (USA)
