= List of constituents of the London and North Eastern Railway =

The London and North Eastern Railway (LNER) was formed out of a number of constituent railway companies at the grouping in 1923.

== Main companies ==
The main companies, showing their route mileage, were:

- Great Eastern Railway (GER) 1,191 1/4 miles (1,906 km)
- Great Central Railway (GCR) 852 1/2 miles (1,364 km)
- Great Northern Railway (GNR) 1,051 1/4 miles (1,680 km)
- Great North of Scotland Railway (GNSR) 334 1/2 miles (535 km)
- Hull and Barnsley Railway 106 1/2 miles (170 km) (H&BR) (which had amalgamated with the NER on 1 April 1922)
- North British Railway 1,378 miles (2,218 km) (NBR)
- North Eastern Railway 1,757 3/4 miles (2,812 km) (NER)

== Subsidiary companies ==
=== Independently operated lines ===
- Colne Valley and Halstead Railway 19 miles (31 km)
- East and West Yorkshire Union Railways 9 1/2 miles (15 km)
- Mid-Suffolk Light Railway 19 1/2 miles (31 km)

=== Leased or worked railways ===
Many of these "railways" existed only in name; they were included on the list at the time of the Railways Act in order to legally qualify each line's position.

- Originally leased to or worked by the NER
  - Brackenhill Light Railway (West Yorkshire)
  - Forcett Depot line (County Durham) 5 1/2 miles (9 km)
  - Great North of England, Clarence and Hartlepool Junction Railway 6 1/2 miles (10 km)
- Originally leased to or worked by the GCR
  - Humber Commercial Railway and Dock
  - Mansfield Railway 10 miles (16 km)
  - North Lindsey Light Railway 12 miles (19 km)
  - Seaforth and Sefton Junction Railway
  - Sheffield District Railway 4 1/2 miles (7 km)
- Originally leased to or worked by the GER
  - London and Blackwall Railway 6 miles (9.7 km)
- Originally leased to or worked by the GNR
  - East Lincolnshire Railway 47 1/2 miles (76 km)
  - Horncastle Railway 7 1/2 miles (12 km)
  - Nottingham and Grantham Railway and Canal 23 miles (37 km)
  - Nottingham Suburban line 4 miles (6.4 km)
  - Stamford and Essendine Railway 12 1/2 miles (20 km)
- Originally leased to or worked by the NBR
  - Edinburgh and Bathgate Railway 10 1/4 miles (16 km)
  - Edinburgh and Northern Railway
  - Forth and Clyde Junction Railway 30 1/2 miles (49 km)
  - Gifford and Garvald Railway 9 1/4 miles (15 km)
  - Glasgow and Milngavie Junction Railway 3 1/4 miles (5 km)
  - Kilsyth and Bonnybridge railway 8 1/2 miles (14 km) (worked jointly with CalR)
  - Lauder Light Railway 10 1/4 miles (16 km)
  - Newburgh and North Fife Railway 13 1/4 miles (21 km)
- Originally leased to or worked by H&BR
  - South Yorkshire Junction Railway 11 1/2 miles (18 km)
- Originally leased to or worked by several constituent companies
  - Nottingham Joint Station Committee
  - West Riding and Grimsby Railway 32 1/2 miles (52 km)

== Independently operated joint companies ==
- East London Railway: jointly leased by the LNER, Southern Railway, Metropolitan Railway (MetR) and District Railway. Traffic operated by MetR (passenger); LNER (goods)
- Cheshire Lines Committee (CLC): operated jointly by LNER/London, Midland and Scottish Railway (LMS). LNER supplies locomotive power; CLC own rolling stock
- Manchester, South Junction and Altrincham Railway: trains worked by both LNER/LMSR

== Joint railways ==
=== Now totally LNER ===
- Great Northern and Great Eastern Joint Railway 123 miles (198 km)
- Hull and Barnsley and Great Central Joint Railway 25 3/4 miles (41.4 km)

=== Joint with LMS ===
- Axholme Joint Railway 27 3/4 miles (44.7 km)
- Cheshire Lines Committee (2/3 share) 142 miles (229 km)
- Caledonian and Dunbartonshire Junction Railway (including Loch Lomond steamers) 7 miles (11 km)
- Dundee and Arbroath Railway (including Carmyllie Light Railway) 23 miles (37 km)
- Great Central and Midland Joint Railway 40 1/4 miles (64.8 km)
- Great Central and North Staffordshire Joint Railway 11 miles (18 km)
- Great Northern and London and North Western Joint Railway 45 miles (72 km)
- Halifax and Ovenden Junction Railway 2 1/2 miles (4.0 km)
- Methley Railway (2/3 share) 6 miles (9.7 km)
- Midland and Great Northern Joint Railway 183 1/4 miles (294.9 km)
- Norfolk and Suffolk Joint Railway (3/4 share) 22 1/4 miles (35.8 km)
- Oldham, Ashton and Guide Bridge Railway 6 1/4 miles (10.1 km)
- Otley and Ilkley Railway 6 1/4 miles (10.1 km)
- Perth General Station (2/3 share)
- Prince's Dock, Glasgow (1/3 share) 1 1/4 miles (2.0 km)
- South Yorkshire Joint Railway (3/5 share) 20 1/2 miles (33.0 km)
- Swinton and Knottingley Joint Railway 19 1/2 miles (31.4 km)
- Tottenham and Hampstead Junction Railway 4 3/4 miles (7.6 km)

=== Joint with GWR ===
- Great Western and Great Central Joint Railway 41 miles (66 km)
