= List of railway companies involved in the 1923 grouping =

Under the Railways Act 1921 the majority of the railway companies in Great Britain (along with a few in Ireland) were grouped into four main companies, often termed the Big Four. The grouping took effect from 1 January 1923.

== List of constituents pre-grouping, later of the Big Four ==
The Big Four and their constituent companies, showing route mileage, were:

- Great Western Railway (GWR)
  - Great Western Railway 3,005 miles (4,836 km)
  - Cambrian Railways (Cambrian) 295 1/4 miles (475 km)
  - Taff Vale Railway (TVR) 124 1/2 miles (200 km)
  - Barry Railway (Barry) 68 miles (109 km)
  - Rhymney Railway (RhyR) 51 miles (82 km)
  - Cardiff Railway (Cardiff) 11 3/4 miles (19 km)
  - Alexandra (Newport and South Wales) Docks and Railway (ADR) 10 1/2 miles (17 km)
    - for the list of subsidiary companies and joint railways see List of constituents of the Great Western Railway
- London and North Eastern Railway (LNER)
  - North Eastern Railway (NER) 1,757 3/4 miles (2,829 km)
  - North British Railway (NBR) 1,378 miles (2,218 km)
  - Great Eastern Railway (GER) 1,191 1/4 miles (1,917 km)
  - Great Northern Railway (GNR) 1,051 1/4 miles (1,692 km)
  - Great Central Railway (GCR) 852 1/2 miles (1,372 km)
  - Great North of Scotland Railway (GNSR) 334 1/2 miles (538 km)
  - Hull and Barnsley Railway (H&BR) 106 1/2 miles (171 km)
    - for the list of subsidiary companies and joint railways see List of constituents of the London and North Eastern Railway
- London, Midland and Scottish Railway (LMS)
  - London and North Western Railway (LNWR); 2,667 1/2 miles (4,293 km)
    - including Lancashire and Yorkshire Railway (L&YR) amalgamated from 1 January 1922
  - Midland Railway (MR) 2,170 3/4 miles (3,493 km)
  - Caledonian Railway (CR) 1,114 1/2 miles (1,794 km)
  - Highland Railway (HR) 506 miles (814 km)
  - Glasgow and South Western Railway (GSWR) 493 1/2 miles (794 km)
  - North Staffordshire Railway (NSR) 220 3/4 miles (355 km)
  - Furness Railway (Furness); 158 miles (254 km)
    - for the list of subsidiary companies and joint railways see List of constituents of the London, Midland and Scottish Railway
  - The Railways Act 1921 did not extend to Ireland, but Irish lines owned by constituent companies became part of the LMS:
    - Northern Counties Committee lines (NCC) 265 1/4 miles (427 km) (owned by the Midland Railway)
    - Dundalk, Newry and Greenore Railway (DNGR) 26 1/2 miles (43 km) (owned by the LNWR)
      - The NCC and Great Northern Railway (Ireland) (GNR(I)) operated the County Donegal Railways Joint Committee lines jointly, and these became joint lines of the LMS and GNR(I) after grouping.
- Southern Railway (SR)
  - London and South Western Railway (LSWR) 1,020 1/2 miles (1,642 km)
  - South Eastern and Chatham Railways' Managing Committee: a working union of the South Eastern Railway and the London, Chatham and Dover Railway 637 3/4 miles (1,026 km)
  - London, Brighton and South Coast Railway (LBSCR) 457 1/4 miles (736 km)
    - for the list of subsidiary companies and joint railways see List of constituent companies of the Southern Railway

== Companies not covered by the grouping ==
Over fifty railway companies were not covered by the grouping. Those in the following list were those organised on an independent basis, usually providing locomotives and rolling stock also. They are included under classification headings.

=== Joint railways ===
Joint lines in this respect were wholly owned by two or more other companies. If not all of the owning companies went into the same group then the joint company could not be grouped. Joint lines did not always operate any services: they owned the track, stations etc. and the services were operated by one or more of the parent companies:

- These are those in which the group companies only are concerned:
  - Cheshire Lines Committee: (GNR, Midland and GCR); now operated under direction of a board of directors appointed by LNER (two-thirds) and LMS (one-third). Length 142 miles (229 km). Rolling stock owned by CLC; locomotive power by LNER.
  - Great Western and Great Central Joint Railway: GWR and GCR; subsequent to the grouping the parent companies were the GWR and the LNER, but the title was not altered.
  - Manchester, South Junction and Altrincham Railway: LNWR and GCR; subsequent to the grouping the parent companies were the LMS and the LNER.
  - Midland and Great Northern Joint Railway: (Midland and GNR; subsequent to the grouping the parent companies were the LMS and the LNER). Length 183 miles (295 km). This was the largest joint system in the UK, and many of the services were operated by the joint company itself. In addition, it received substantial traffic from the GNR and MR/LMS, but rather less post-grouping from the LNER (which also owned the competing ex-GER system in East Anglia).
  - Somerset and Dorset Joint Railway: (Midland and LSWR). Length 105 miles (169 km).
- Joint lines where one or more partners were ungrouped:
  - Aylesbury Station: joint between the GW & GC Joint and the Metropolitan and Great Central Joint Committee
  - East London Railway: prior to grouping, this railway was owned one-sixth each by the Great Eastern Railway, London, Brighton and South Coast Railway, Metropolitan Railway, District Railway; and one-third by the South Eastern and Chatham Railway (as successors to the London, Chatham and Dover Railway and South Eastern Railway, who had owned one-sixth each). After grouping, it was owned half by the Southern, and one-sixth each by the LNER, Metropolitan and District. Length 5 miles (8 km). Managed and operated by Met; goods traffic by LNER.
  - Metropolitan and Great Central Joint Committee: prior to grouping, owned by the Metropolitan Railway and GCR; post-Grouping, Metropolitan and LNER.

=== Railways not included in group companies ===
==== Electric or electric and steam lines ====
- Railways associated with the Underground Electric Railways Company of London:
  - Central London Railway: 7 miles (11 km). Trains worked through to Ealing over the Ealing and Shepherd's Bush Railway (GWR)
  - City and South London Railway: 7 1/4 miles (12 km)
  - London Electric Railway: 24 miles (39 km): amalgamation of the Baker Street and Waterloo Railway, Great Northern, Piccadilly and Brompton Railway and Charing Cross, Euston and Hampstead Railway
  - District Railway: 27 3/4 miles (45 km)
- Other electric/steam railways:
  - Liverpool Overhead Railway: 6 1/2 miles (10 km)
  - Mersey Railway: 4 3/4 miles (8 km)
  - Metropolitan Railway: steam and electric 65 3/4 miles (106 km) including the Great Northern and City Railway

==== Light and similar railways (standard gauge) ====
- Bideford, Westward Ho! and Appledore Railway: 7 miles (11 km) closed at time of grouping
- Bishops Castle Railway: 9 3/4 miles (16 km)
- Corringham Light Railway: 2 3/4 miles (4 km)
- Derwent Valley Light Railway: 16 miles (26 km)
- Easingwold Railway: 2 1/2 miles (4 km)
- East Kent Railway: 48 miles (77 km)
- Glasgow (Cable) Subway: 6 3/4 miles (11 km)
- Hellingly Hospital Railway: 1 1/4 miles (2 km)
- Hundred of Manhood and Selsey Tramways: 8 miles (13 km) *
- Kent & East Sussex Railway: 24 miles (39 km) *
- Mumbles Railway: 5 1/2 miles (9 km)
- Nidd Valley Light Railway: 6 miles (10 km) public; 7 miles (11 km) private
- North Sunderland Railway: 4 miles (6 km)
- Rowrah and Kelton Fell Railway: 3 miles (5 km)
- Shropshire and Montgomeryshire Railway 26 miles (42 km) *
- Stocksbridge Railway: 2 miles (3 km)
- Swansea Improvements and Tramways Company: 18 miles (29 km)
- Wantage Tramway: 2 miles (3 km)
- Weston, Clevedon and Portishead Railway: 14 1/2 miles (23 km)

==== Light and similar railways (narrow gauge) ====
- Ashover Light Railway: 2 ft (610 mm); 7 1/4 miles (12 km)
- Brighton Electric Railway: 2 feet 8 1/2 inches (826 mm); 1 3/4 miles (3 km)
- Camborne and Redruth Tramway: 3 ft 6 in (1,067 mm); 3 1/4 miles (5 km)
- Campbeltown and Machrihanish Railway: 2 ft 3 in (686 mm); 6 miles (10 km)
- Corris Railway: 2 ft 3 in (686 mm); 11 miles (18 km)
- Ravenglass and Eskdale Railway: 15 in (381 mm); 7 1/4 miles (12 km)
- Ffestiniog Railway: 1 ft 11 1/2 in (597 mm); 14 1/2 miles (23 km)
- Glyn Valley Tramway: 2 feet 4 1/2 inches (724 mm); 8 1/4 miles (13 km)
- North Wales Narrow Gauge Railways: 1 ft 11 1/2 in (597 mm); 12 1/4 miles (20 km)
- Portmadoc, Beddgelert and South Snowdon Railway: 1 ft 11 1/2 in (597 mm); 4 3/4 miles (8 km)
- Rye and Camber Tramway: 3 ft (914 mm); 3 miles (5 km)
- Snailbeach District Railways: 2 feet 4 inches (710 mm); 3 1/4 miles (5 km)
- Snowdon Mountain Tramroad: 800 mm (2 ft 7 1/2 in); 5 miles (8 km); rack railway
- Southwold Railway: 3 ft (914 mm); 9 miles (14 km)
- Talyllyn Railway: 2 ft 3 in (686 mm); 6 3/4 miles (11 km)
- Wolverton and Stony Stratford Tramway: 3 ft 6 in (1,067 mm); owned by LMSR

==== Railways outside the jurisdiction of the Railways Act 1921 ====
The Railways Act 1921 only extended to Great Britain. Railways in Ireland and the Crown Dependencies were not affected unless owned by a railway company in Great Britain. The railways included in this section were standard gauge, unless otherwise noted:

- Alderney Railway
- Belfast and County Down Railway; 5 ft 3 in (1,600 mm)
- Cork, Bandon and South Coast Railway; 5 ft 3 in (1,600 mm); 94 miles (151 km)
- Dublin and South Eastern Railway; 5 ft 3 in (1,600 mm); 161 miles (259 km)
- Great Northern Railway (Ireland); 5 ft 3 in (1,600 mm);
- Great Southern and Western Railway; 5 ft 3 in (1,600 mm); 1,100 miles (1,770 km)
- Guernsey Railway; 3 miles (5 km)
- Isle of Man Railway; 3 ft (914 mm); 46 1/4 miles (74 km)
- Jersey Eastern Railway; 6 1/4 miles (10 km)
- Jersey Railway and Tramways; 3 ft 6 in (1,067 mm); 7 1/2 miles (12 km)
- Londonderry and Lough Swilly Railway; 3 ft (914 mm)
- Sligo, Leitrim and Northern Counties Railway; 5 ft 3 in (1,600 mm)
- Manx Electric Railway; 3 ft (914 mm); 18 miles (29 km); and 3 ft 6 in (1,067 mm); 5 miles (8 km)
- Midland Great Western Railway; 5 ft 3 in (1,600 mm); 538 miles (866 km)

==== Miscellaneous railways ====
The railways included in this section were standard gauge, unless otherwise noted:

- Felixstowe Docks and Railway: 1/2 mile (1 km)
- Manchester Ship Canal: 156 miles (251 km)
- Mersey Docks and Harbour Board: 104 miles (167 km)
- Milford Haven Dock and Railway: 1 1/4 miles (2 km)
- Pentewan Railway: 2 ft 6 in (762 mm); 4 miles (6 km); temporarily closed 1923
- Trafford Park: 18 miles (29 km)

== See also ==
- History of rail transport in Great Britain
- Rail transport in Great Britain
