= List of constituents of the London, Midland and Scottish Railway =

The London, Midland and Scottish Railway (LMS) was created under the terms of the Railways Act 1921. The first schedule to that Act listed four groups, and for each, a number of "Constituent Companies" were listed, as were a number of subsidiary companies. The constituent companies would amalgamate to create a new railway company, and the subsidiary companies would be absorbed either by one of the constituent companies prior to the amalgamation, or by the new railway company after amalgamation. The group that was to become the LMS was described in the Act as "the North Western, Midland and West Scottish Group".

== Constituent companies ==
The following made up the London, Midland and Scottish Railway as a result of the Railways Act 1921:

- Caledonian Railway (CalR) 1,114.5 mi (1,793.6 km)
- Furness Railway (Furness) 158 mi (254 km)
- Glasgow and South Western Railway 493.5 mi (794.2 km)
- Highland Railway (HR) 506 mi (814 km)
- London and North Western Railway (LNWR) – with which the Lancashire and Yorkshire Railway (L&YR) had been amalgamated on 1 January 1922. Total route mileage (1923) was 2,667.5 mi (4,292.9 km)
- Midland Railway (MidR) 2,170.75 mi (3,493.48 km)
- North Staffordshire Railway (NSR) 220.75 mi (355.26 km)

== Subsidiary companies ==
Independently operated lines

- Cleator and Workington Junction Railway 30 1/2 miles (49 km) (partially worked by the Furness Railway)
- Knott End Railway 11 1/2 miles (19 km)
- Maryport and Carlisle Railway 42 3/4 miles (68.8 km)
- North London Railway 16 miles (26 km) (managed by the LNWR)
- Stratford-upon-Avon and Midland Junction Railway 67 1/2 miles (109 km)
- Wirral Railway 13 3/4 miles (22 km)

Independent lines for which rolling stock was provided by other companies

- Cockermouth, Keswick and Penrith Railway 30 3/4 miles (49 km)

Non-working companies

- Originally leased to or worked by LNWR
  - Charnwood Forest Railway 10 1/2 miles (17 km)
  - Dearne Valley Railway 21 miles (34 km)
  - Harborne Railway 2 1/2 miles (4 km)
  - Mold and Denbigh Junction Railway 15 miles (24 km)
  - Shropshire Union Railways and Canal Company 29 1/4 miles (47 km) [part of this system was jointly leased with the Great Western Railway (GWR)]
- Originally leased to or worked by MidR
  - Tottenham and Forest Gate Railway 6 miles (10 km)
  - Yorkshire Dales Railway 9 miles (14 km)
- Originally leased to or worked by CalR
  - Arbroath and Forfar Railway 14 3/4 miles (24 km)
  - Brechin and Edzell District Railway 6 1/4 miles (10 km)
  - Callander and Oban Railway 99 3/4 miles (161 km)
  - Dundee and Newtyle Railway 14 1/2 miles (23 km)
  - Killin Railway 5 1/4 miles (8 km)
  - Lanarkshire and Ayrshire Railway 36 1/4 miles (58 km)
  - Solway Junction Railway 12 1/4 miles (20 km)
- Originally leased to or worked by HR
  - Dornoch Light Railway 7 3/4 miles (12 km)
  - Wick and Lybster Light Railway 13 1/2 miles (22 km)
- Originally leased to or worked by NSR
  - Leek and Manifold Valley Light Railway (narrow gauge) 8 1/4 miles (13 km)
- Originally leased to or worked by several component companies
  - North and South Western Junction Railway 5 1/4 miles (8 km)
  - Portpatrick and Wigtownshire Joint Railway 82 1/4 miles (132 km)

== Joint railways ==
=== After 1923 amalgamations comprised wholly in the LMS ===
- Carlisle Citadel Station and Goods Traffic Joint Committees (originally joint owned by various companies)
- were LNW/MidR joint:
  - Ashby and Nuneaton Railway 29 1/4 miles (47 km)
  - Enderby Railway 2 1/4 miles (4 km)
- were LNW/L&YR joint:
  - Lancashire Union Railway 12 3/4 miles (21 km)
  - North Union Railway 6 1/2 miles (10 km)
  - Preston and Longridge Railway 8 miles (13 km)
  - Preston and Wyre Joint Railway 46 miles (74 km)
- was Furness/MidR joint
  - Furness and Midland Joint Railway 9 3/4 miles (16 km)
- was Furness/LNWR joint
  - Whitehaven Cleator and Egremont Railway 35 miles (56 km)
- were Cal/GSW joint
  - Glasgow, Barrhead and Kilmarnock Joint Railway 29 3/4 miles (48 km)
  - Glasgow and Paisley Joint Railway 14 1/4 miles (23 km)

=== After 1923 amalgamations joint with London and North Eastern Railway ===
- Axholme Joint Railway 27 3/4 miles (45 km)
- Cheshire Lines Committee (1/3 share) 142 miles (229 km)
- City of Glasgow Union Railway
- Dumbarton and Balloch Joint Railway (including Loch Lomond steamers) 7 miles (11 km)
- Dundee and Arbroath Railway (including Carmyllie Light Railway) 23 miles (37 km)
- Great Central and Midland Joint Railway 40 1/4 miles (65 km)
- Great Central, Hull and Barnsley, and Midland Joint Railway (1/3 share) 4 miles (6 km)
- Great Central and North Staffordshire Joint Railway 11 miles (18 km)
- Great Northern and London and North Western Joint Railway 45 miles (72 km)
- Halifax and Ovenden Railway 2 1/2 miles (4 km)
- Halifax High Level Railway 3 miles (5 km)
- Manchester South Junction and Altrincham Railway (a "joint working arrangement") 9 1/2 miles (15 km)
- Methley Joint Railway 6 miles (10 km)
- Midland and Great Northern Joint Railway 183 1/4 miles (295 km)
- Norfolk and Suffolk Joint Railway (was GER/MidR/GNR joint) 22 1/2 miles (36 km)
- Oldham, Ashton and Guide Bridge Railway 6 1/4 miles (10 km)
- Otley and Ilkley Joint Railway 6 1/4 miles (10 km)
- Perth General Station Committee (2/3 share)
- Prince's Dock, Glasgow 1 1/4 miles (2 km)
- South Yorkshire Joint Railway (2/5 share) 20 1/2 miles (33 km)
- Swinton and Knottingley Joint Railway 19 1/2 miles (31 km)
- Tottenham and Hampstead Junction Railway 4 3/4 miles (8 km)

=== After 1923 amalgamations joint with GWR ===
- Birkenhead Railway 56 1/2 miles (91 km)
- Brecon and Merthyr Railway & London and North Western Joint Railway 6 miles (10 km)
- Brynmawr and Western Valleys Railway 1 1/4 miles (2 km)
- Clee Hill Railway 6 miles (10 km)
- Clifton Extension Railway 9 miles (14 km)
- Halesowen Joint Railway 6 miles (10 km)
- Nantybwch and Rhymney Railway 3 miles (5 km)
- Severn and Wye Railway 39 miles (63 km)
- Shrewsbury and Hereford Railway 82 3/4 miles (133 km)
- Tenbury Railway 5 miles (8 km)
- Vale of Towy Railway (owned by GWR but leased jointly) 11 miles (18 km)
- West London Railway 2 1/4 miles (4 km)
- Wrexham and Minera Railway 3 miles (5 km)

=== After 1923 amalgamations joint with Southern Railway ===
- Somerset and Dorset Joint Railway 105 miles (169 km)

=== After 1923 amalgamations joint with District Railway ===
- Whitechapel and Bow Railway 2 miles (3 km)

== Irish lines ==
The Railways Act 1921 did not extend to Ireland, but Irish lines owned by constituent companies became part of the LMS:

- Dundalk, Newry and Greenore Railway (DNGR) 26 1/2 miles (43 km) (owned by the LNWR) – operated from 1933 by the GNR(I)
- Northern Counties Committee lines (NCC) 265 1/4 miles (427 km) (owned by the Midland Railway)
  - The NCC and Great Northern Railway of Ireland (GNR(I)) operated the County Donegal Railways Joint Committee lines jointly, and these became joint lines of the LMS and GNR(I) after grouping. 91 miles (146 km)

== Shipping companies ==
- Caledonian Steam Packet Company

== Shareholdings ==
- Great Western Railway (minority shareholding)
- London and North Eastern Railway
- London Electric Railway until 30 June 1933
- London Passenger Transport Board from 1 July 1933
- Great Northern Railway (Ireland) (minority shareholding)
- Great Southern Railways (minority shareholding)
