= Doncaster (York Road) railway station =

Former railway station in South Yorkshire, England

Doncaster (York Road)
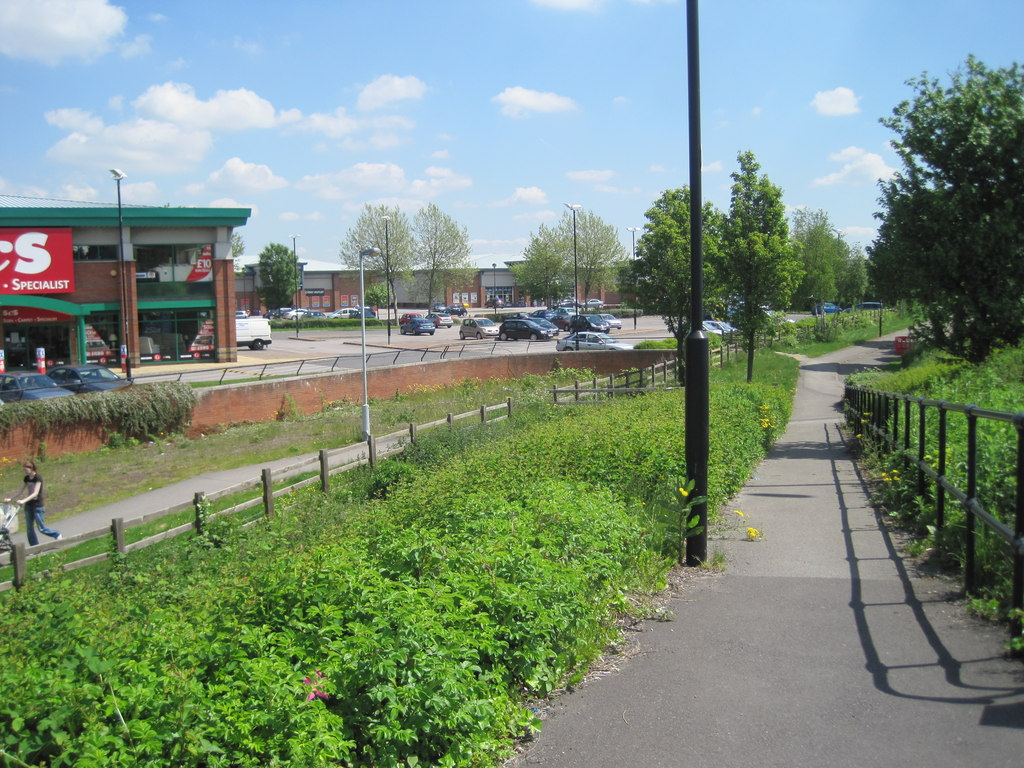
- Site of the station (2013)

General information
- Location: Doncaster, Doncaster; England
- Coordinates: 53.529860°N 1.145600°W
- Grid reference: SE566041

Other information
- Status: Disused

History
- Original company: Hull and Barnsley and Great Central Joint Railway
Location

Doncaster (York Road) railway station was built as a terminus for services on the Hull and Barnsley and Great Central Joint Railway in Doncaster, South Yorkshire, England. It was reached by a triangular junction from the main line just outside town. The station was set at the north end of town, just beyond the Doncaster Avoiding Line, in the fork of the old A1 and the A19 (York Road).

The line and its stations were ready for opening on 1 May 1916 but its five-passenger stations, at Snaith & Pollington, Sykehouse, Thorpe-in-Balne, Doncaster (York Road) and Warmsworth never saw a passenger train. The route duplicated that of other railways in the area and the stations were some way from the villages they purported to serve.

The station was kept fully intact until the late 1960s when demolition finally came.

The only passenger trains to work over the line were enthusiasts specials, the last of these was the "Doncaster Decoy", which ran on 5 October 1968.

Preceding station	Disused railways	Following station
Warmsworth	Hull and Barnsley and Great Central Joint Railway (Warmsworth Branch)	Terminus
Thorpe-in-Balne	Hull and Barnsley and Great Central Joint Railway (Thorpe-in-Balne Branch)	Terminus
