= Anston railway station =

Disused railway station in South Yorkshire, England

Anston
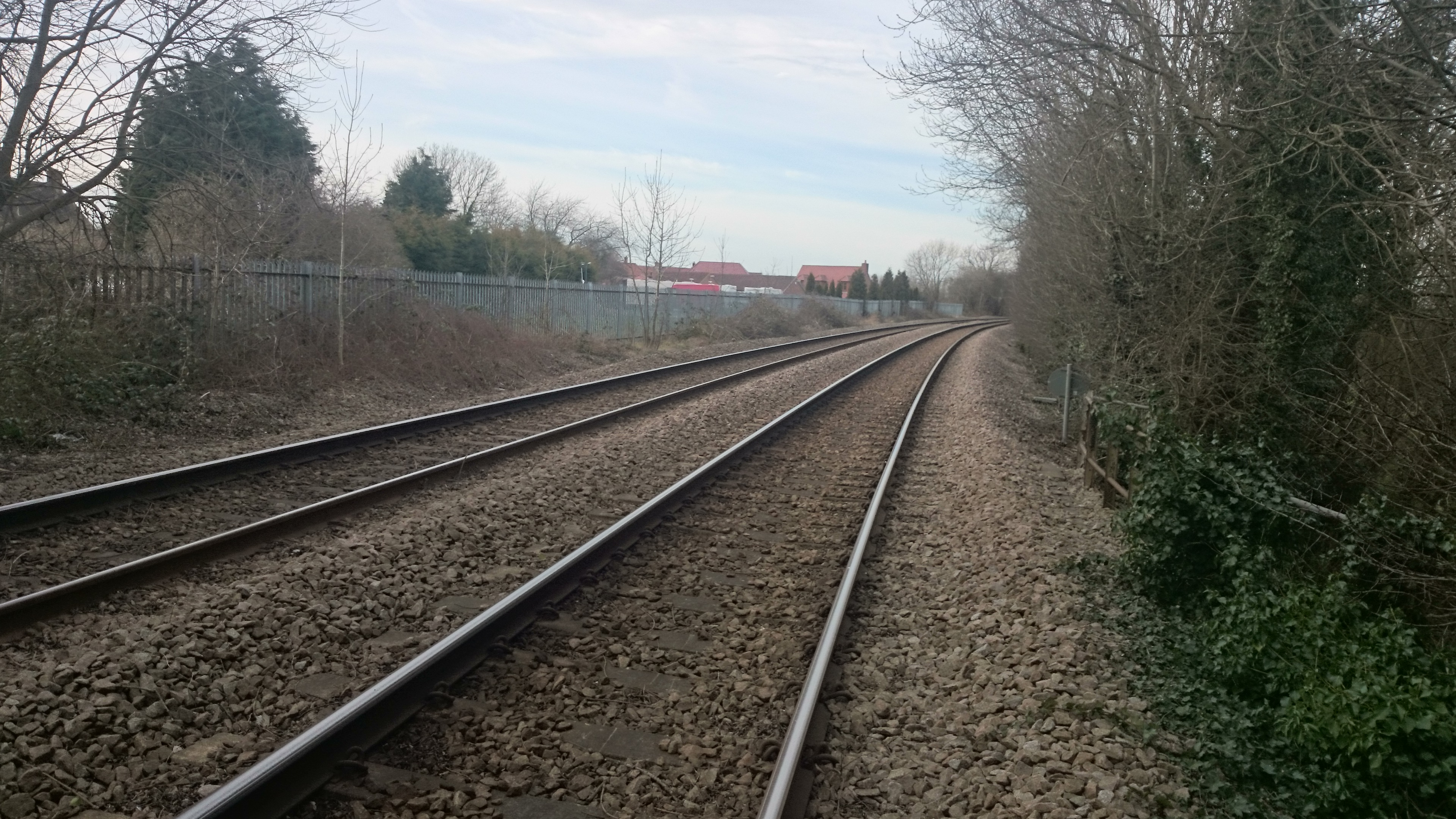
- Site of station in 2015

General information
- Location: North Anston and South Anston, Rotherham; England
- Coordinates: 53.352056°N 1.225250°W
- Grid reference: SK516841
- Platforms: 2

Other information
- Status: Disused

History
- Original company: Great Central and Midland Joint Railway
- Pre-grouping: Great Central and Midland Joint Railway
- Post-grouping: Great Central and Midland Joint Railway

Key dates
- 20 May 1912: Station opens
- June 1921: Station closes
- October 1921: Station reopens
- April 1926: Station closes
- 25 July 1927: Station reopens
- 2 December 1929: Station closes
Location

Anston railway station was situated on the Great Central and Midland Joint Railway line between the villages of North Anston and South Anston near Rotherham and Sheffield, South Yorkshire, England.

Passenger services on the line, which came under the control of the South Yorkshire Joint Committee began on 7 December 1910 and were jointly operated by the Great Central Railway and the Great Northern Railway. The Great Northern Railway left this arrangement after just one year leaving the G.C.R. to offer a service between Doncaster and Shireoaks. This service was extended to Worksop in 1920 in an attempt to increase passenger revenues.

== History ==
At the opening of the line there was no station at Anston, this was built later and opened to traffic on 20 May 1912. It was a double platform station with waiting shelters on each side. Construction was in wood, which on its closure on 2 December 1929, made easy to relocate. It was moved to serve an army camp in Scotland during the Second World War.

The station was opened by the Great Central and Midland Joint Railway some 18 months after those on the neighbouring South Yorkshire Joint Railway, and passenger services, which by this time were Great Central Railway only operated, began using the station. It became a joint London, Midland and Scottish Railway and London and North Eastern Railway line following the Grouping of 1923. The station closed in 1929, but the line's freight services passed to the Eastern Region of British Railways on nationalisation in 1948.

== The site today ==
The line through the site remains open to freight services.

| Preceding station | Historical railways | Following station |
|---|---|---|
| Dinnington and Laughton | Great Central and Midland Joint Railway | Shireoaks |
| Warmsworth | Hull and Barnsley and Great Central Joint Railway | Terminus |
