= Dinnington and Laughton railway station =

Former railway station in South Yorkshire, England

Dinnington and Laughton
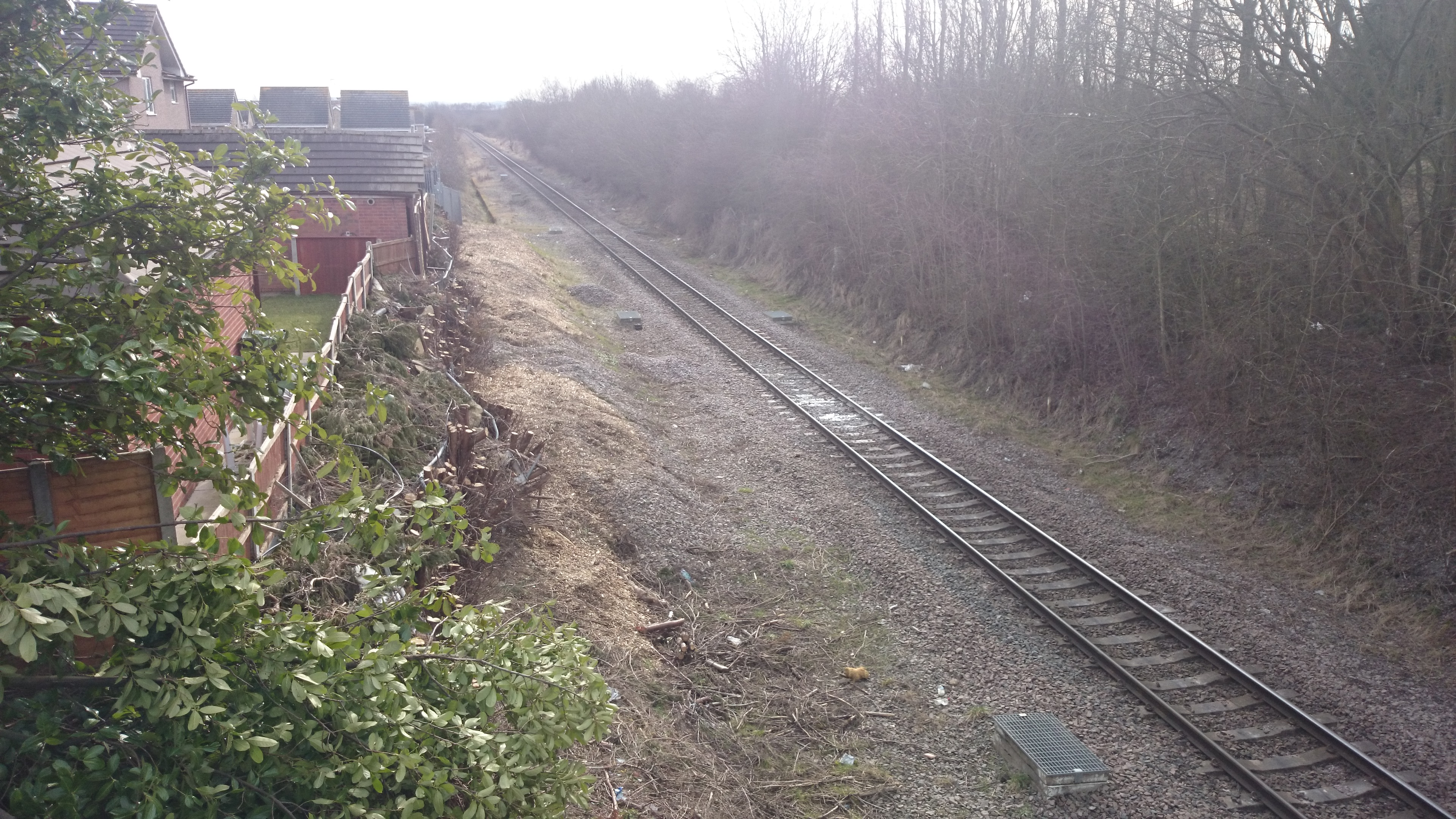
- Site of the station in 2015

General information
- Location: Dinnington and Laughton, Rotherham; England
- Coordinates: 53.37912°N 1.23444°W
- Grid reference: SK510871
- Platforms: 2

Other information
- Status: Disused

Key dates
- December 1910: Station opens
- April 1926: Station closes
- April 1927: Station reopens
- 1929: Station closes
Location

Dinnington and Laughton railway station was situated on the South Yorkshire Joint Railway line between the town of Dinnington and village of Laughton-en-le-Morthen, near Rotherham, South Yorkshire, England.

The station was opened in December 1910 and it was served by a Doncaster - Shireoaks passenger service provided jointly by the Great Central Railway (GCR) and the Great Northern Railway (GNR). The GNR left this arrangement after just one year and the GCR carried on, extending the service to Worksop in 1920. The service closed between April 1926 and April 1927 and finally in 1929.

The station buildings, a wooden booking office / waiting room and lamp room on the Worksop bound platform and brick built structures opposite lasted until the mid - 1960s before demolition. The signal box, named Dinnington Station and situated at the south end of the Doncaster bound platform, was abolished in 1973.

The line is still open to freight trains, and empty coaching stock moves and along with Network Rail recording trains and trains to and from WH Davis wagon works at Shirebrook.

Preceding station	Disused railways	Following station
Anston; Line open, station closed	Great Central and Midland Joint Railway; South Yorkshire Joint Railway	Maltby; Line open, station closed
