= Carlton Towers railway station =

Disused railway station in North Yorkshire, England

Carlton Towers
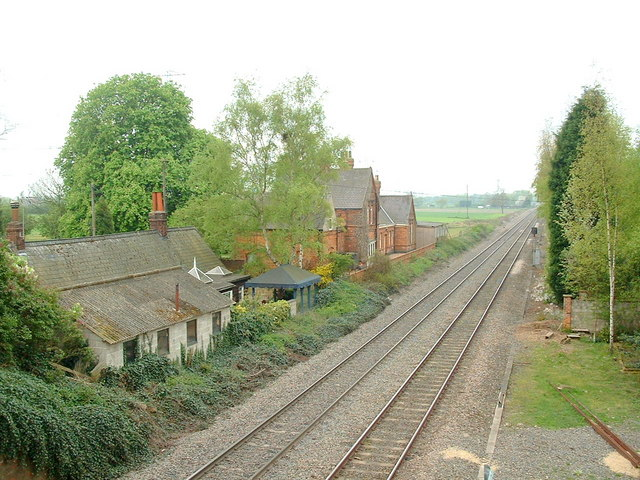
- The site of the station in 2007

General information
- Location: Carlton, North Yorkshire; England
- Coordinates: 53.718°N 1.0197°W
- Grid reference: SE647250
- Platforms: 2

Other information
- Status: Disused

History
- Original company: Hull, Barnsley and West Riding Junction Railway
- Pre-grouping: Hull and Barnsley Railway
- Post-grouping: LNER

Key dates
- 27 July 1885: Opened as Carlton
- 1 July 1922: Name changed to Carlton Towers
- 1 January 1932: Closed to passengers
- 1959: Closed completely
Location

Carlton Towers railway station served the village of Carlton, Selby, England from 1885 to 1959 on the Hull and Barnsley Railway.

== History ==
The station opened as Carlton on 27 July 1885 by the Hull, Barnsley and West Riding Junction Railway. 'Towers' was added on to its name on 1 July 1922. The station closed to passengers on 1 January 1932 and to goods traffic in 1959.

Preceding station	Historical railways	Following station
Kirk Smeaton	Hull, Barnsley and West Riding Junction Railway; Hull and Barnsley Railway	Drax Abbey
Snaith and Pollington	Hull and Barnsley and Great Central Joint Railway	Drax Abbey
