= Harry Crofts Colliery =

Former coal mine in South Yorkshire, England

Coordinates: 53.331°N 1.207°W

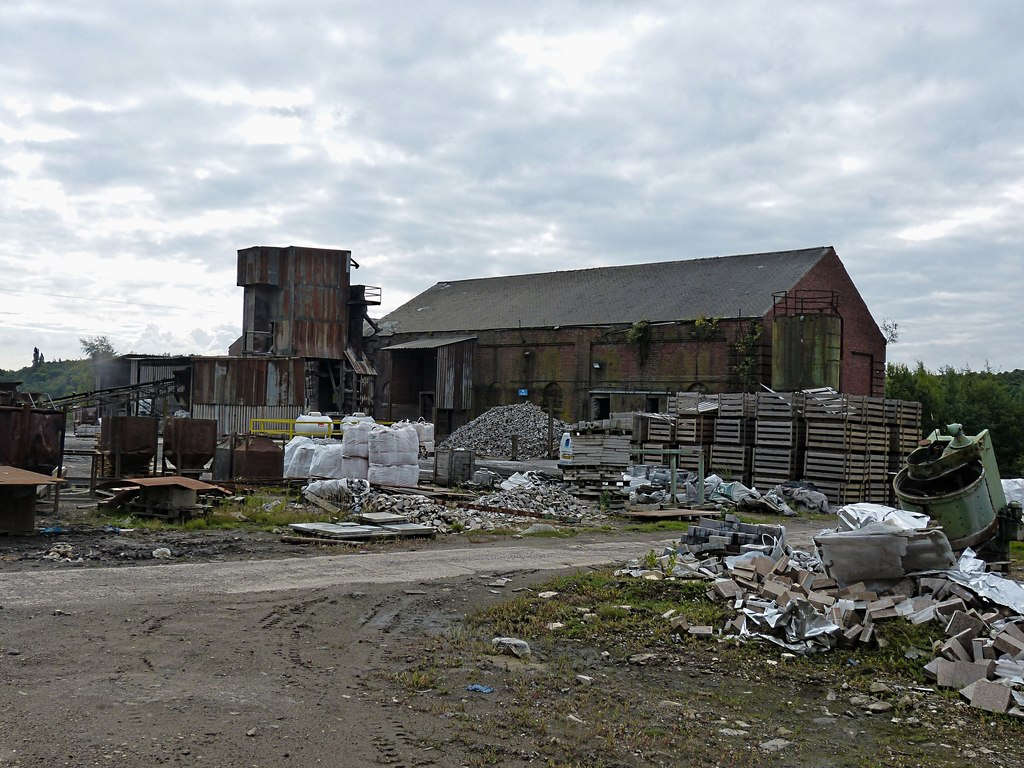
Remaining buildings of the former colliery, now used by a quarry.

Harry Crofts Colliery was a small, short lived coal mine within the parish of South Anston, near Rotherham, South Yorkshire.

The colliery was sunk between 1924 and 1926 and closed in 1930. It was situated about two miles east of Kiveton Park railway station and was on the north side of the main line of the L.N.E.R. almost at the junction of the west curve to the Great Central and Midland Joint Railway at Brantcliffe West Junction. This line was closed before the colliery opened and was used for wagon storage into the 1960s.
