= Tickhill and Wadworth railway station =

Disused railway station in South Yorkshire, England

Tickhill and Wadworth

General information
- Location: Tickhill and Wadworth, Doncaster; England
- Coordinates: 53.45158°N 1.12520°W
- Grid reference: SK581953
- Platforms: 2

Other information
- Status: Disused

History
- Original company: South Yorkshire Joint Railway
- Pre-grouping: South Yorkshire Joint Railway
- Post-grouping: South Yorkshire Joint Railway

Key dates
- 1 December 1910: Opened
- April 1926: Closed
- 25 July 1927: Reopened
- 8 July 1929: Closed for passengers
- 2 November 1964: closed for freight
Location

Tickhill and Wadworth railway station, originally simply known as Tickhill, was located where the road linking the town of Tickhill and the village of Wadworth in its name crossed the South Yorkshire Joint Railway. Being about halfway between it was intended that it should serve both Tickhill and Wadworth, near Doncaster, South Yorkshire, England.

The station, opened on 1 December 1910, had two flanking platforms and substantial buildings in the "Double Pavilion" style. The passenger service, between Doncaster and Shireoaks was operated jointly by the Great Central Railway and the Great Northern Railway for the first year when the G.N.R. left the arrangement.

The station was closed temporarily between April 1926 and April 1927 and finally on 8 July 1929, after a bacterial outbreak due to horse faeces. However the wooden signal box at the station's southern end was still extant in 1959, when it was photographed by H. B. Priestly.

Only the station master's house and some remnants of the platform and the signal box's coal bunker still exist.

| Preceding station | Disused railways | Following station |
|---|---|---|
| Maltby; Line open, station closed | South Yorkshire Joint Railway | Doncaster; Line and station open |
