= Maltby railway station =

Disused railway station in South Yorkshire, England

Maltby
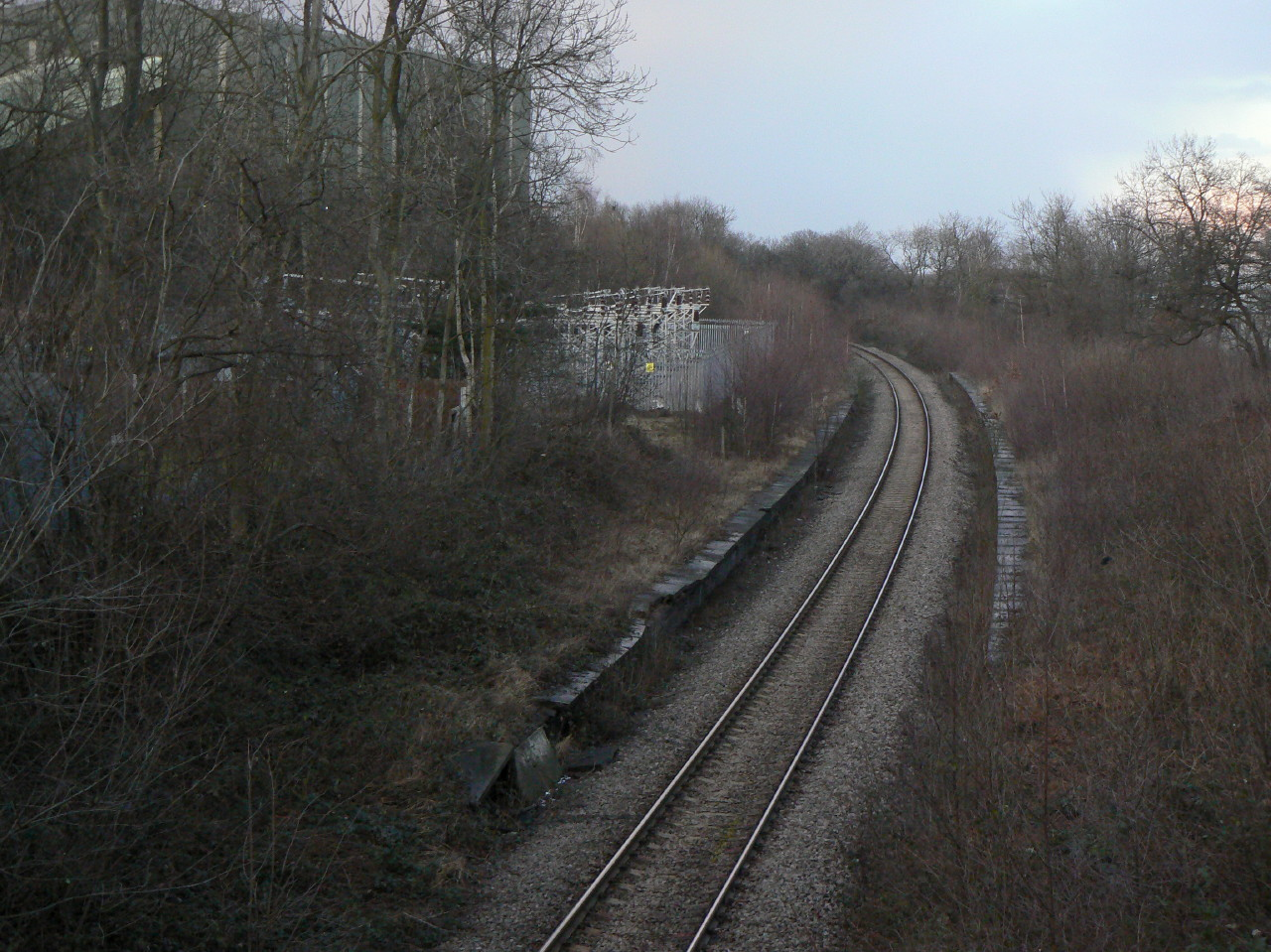
- Maltby station (disused, 2010)

General information
- Location: Maltby, Rotherham; England
- Coordinates: 53.4231°N 1.1702°W
- Grid reference: SK552921
- Platforms: 2

Other information
- Status: Disused

History
- Original company: South Yorkshire Joint Railway
- Pre-grouping: Great Central Railway
- Post-grouping: London, Midland and Scottish Railway and London and North Eastern Railway Joint

Key dates
- 1 December 1910: Opened
- April 1926: Closed
- 25 July 1927: Reopened
- 2 December 1929: Closed
Location

Maltby railway station was located on the South Yorkshire Joint Railway (SYJR) on the eastern edge of Maltby, South Yorkshire, England. It opened 1910 and closed in 1929.

== History ==
The station was opened in 1910, built by the Great Central Railway (GCR), who operated the passenger service over the SYJR between Doncaster and Shireoaks jointly with the Great Northern Railway (GNR). The GNR found the service unprofitable and withdrew their services in 1911, leaving only the GCR service which continued until 1929. In April 1926 the passenger service was suspended and Maltby station was closed as a result of the general strike but reopened in July 1927 only to close for good when the passenger service was permanently withdrawn in December 1929.

The main station buildings, on the Doncaster bound platform, were of the Great Central's "Double Pavilion" style containing all the usual facilities, whilst the other platform had a simple brick built waiting shelter. In its second life the main building was utilised by a building contractor who also made use of adjacent land to store his plant.

The last train to call (terminate) at Maltby was a 16-coach "Inter Grammar Schools Sports Day Special" in 1963 which ran from Mexborough hauled by a double-headed B1 from the home depot, one of its last special passenger workings before the work was transferred to Wath. It was almost a mile and a half walk from the station to the local grammar school sports field.

Preceding station	Disused railways	Following station
Dinnington and Laughton; Line open, station closed	South Yorkshire Joint Railway	Tickhill & Wadworth; Line open, station closed
