= Thorpe-in-Balne railway station =

Former railway station in Yorkshire, England

Coordinates: 53.5919°N 1.0936°W

Thorpe-in-Balne
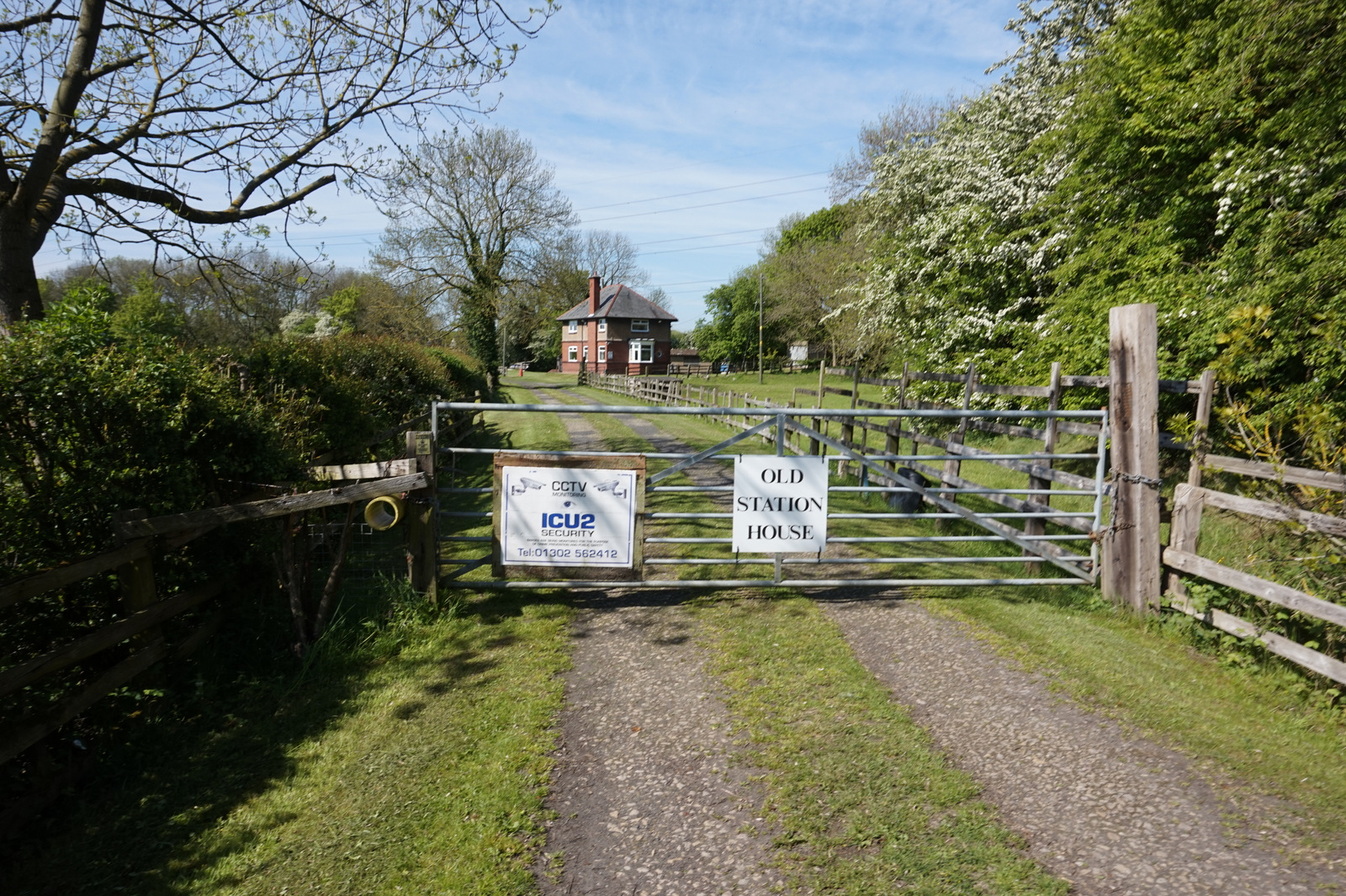
- Looking along the dismantled line towards the former station house and the site of the station (2019)

General information
- Location: Thorpe in Balne, Doncaster; England
- Grid reference: SE600109

Other information
- Status: Disused

History
- Original company: Hull and Barnsley and Great Central Joint Railway
Location

Thorpe-in-Balne railway station was an unopened railway station on the Hull and Barnsley and Great Central Joint Railway. It was situated about 1 mile (1.6 km) from the village of Thorpe in Balne, South Yorkshire, England adjacent to the road and some 6 miles (10 km) north of Doncaster.

Like the other stations on the line it was built ready to accept passenger trains with flanking platforms and facilities, however the passengers never came. Although it was built ready for the opening on 1 May 1916 the line only opened for goods traffic, particularly coal, and stayed that way all its working life.

The structures remained in position until the early 1960s when they were demolished.

The line saw very few passenger workings, all of them enthusiasts specials, the final one being the "Doncaster Decoy" on 5 October 1968.

Preceding station	Disused railways	Following station
Doncaster York Road	Hull and Barnsley and Great Central Joint Railway	Sykehouse
Warmsworth	Hull and Barnsley and Great Central Joint Railway	Sykehouse
