= Warmsworth railway station =

Disused railway station in South Yorkshire, England

Coordinates: 53.498°N 1.182°W

Warmsworth
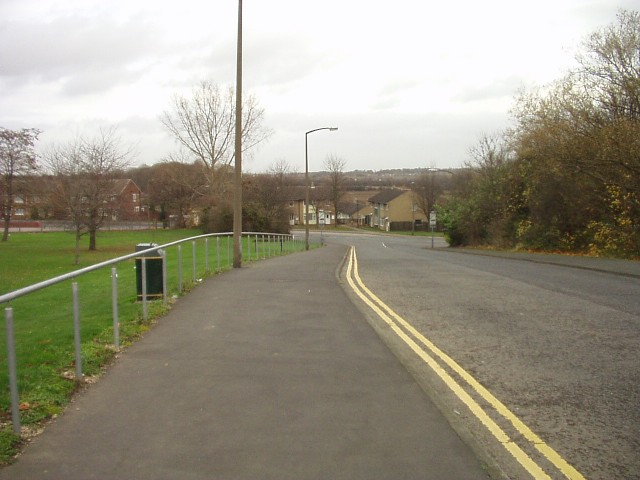
- Location of the former station in 2008

General information
- Location: Warmsworth, Doncaster; England
- Grid reference: SK542999
- Platforms: 2

Other information
- Status: Disused

History
- Original company: Hull and Barnsley and Great Central Joint Railway
Location

Warmsworth railway station was a railway station to serve the village of Warmsworth, South Yorkshire, England and was on the Hull and Barnsley and Great Central Joint Railway. It was built ready for the opening of the line on 1 May 1916 with flanking platforms and facilities. However, although the line opened to goods traffic on that date, along with the other stations on the line it never opened for passengers.

The only passenger trains to operate over the line were enthusiasts' specials, the last of these being the "Doncaster Decoy" on 5 October 1968.

Preceding station	Disused railways	Following station
Doncaster York Road	Hull and Barnsley and Great Central Joint Railway	Anston
Thorpe-in-Balne	Hull and Barnsley and Great Central Joint Railway	Anston
