= Tropical Butterfly House and Wildlife Centre =

UK visitor attraction

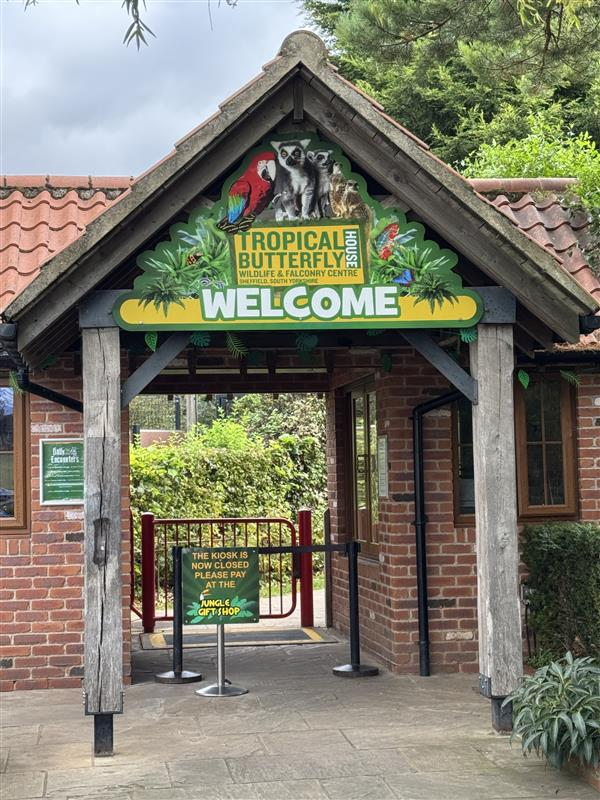
- Interactive map of Tropical Butterfly House and Wildlife Centre
- 53°21′21″N 1°12′15″W
- Date opened: 23 March 1994
- Location: Woodsetts Road, Anston, South Yorkshire, England
- Website: Official website

The Tropical Butterfly House and Wildlife Centre is a butterfly house and wildlife park in North Anston, South Yorkshire, England.

== History ==
The centre was opened on a 4.5-acre site on 23 March 1994. The site has since grown and has become one of the biggest tourist attractions in the area.

In 2024, the centre won gold at the British and Irish Association of Zoos and Aquariums horticulture awards.

In 2023 Wally, a wallaby at the centre, was injured in a fall; after rehabilitation by the park keepers, he was saved from needing a tail amputation. Also in 2023, a common raven named Odin became a viral phenomenon when the centre posted videos of him painting.
