= Doncaster Avoiding Line =

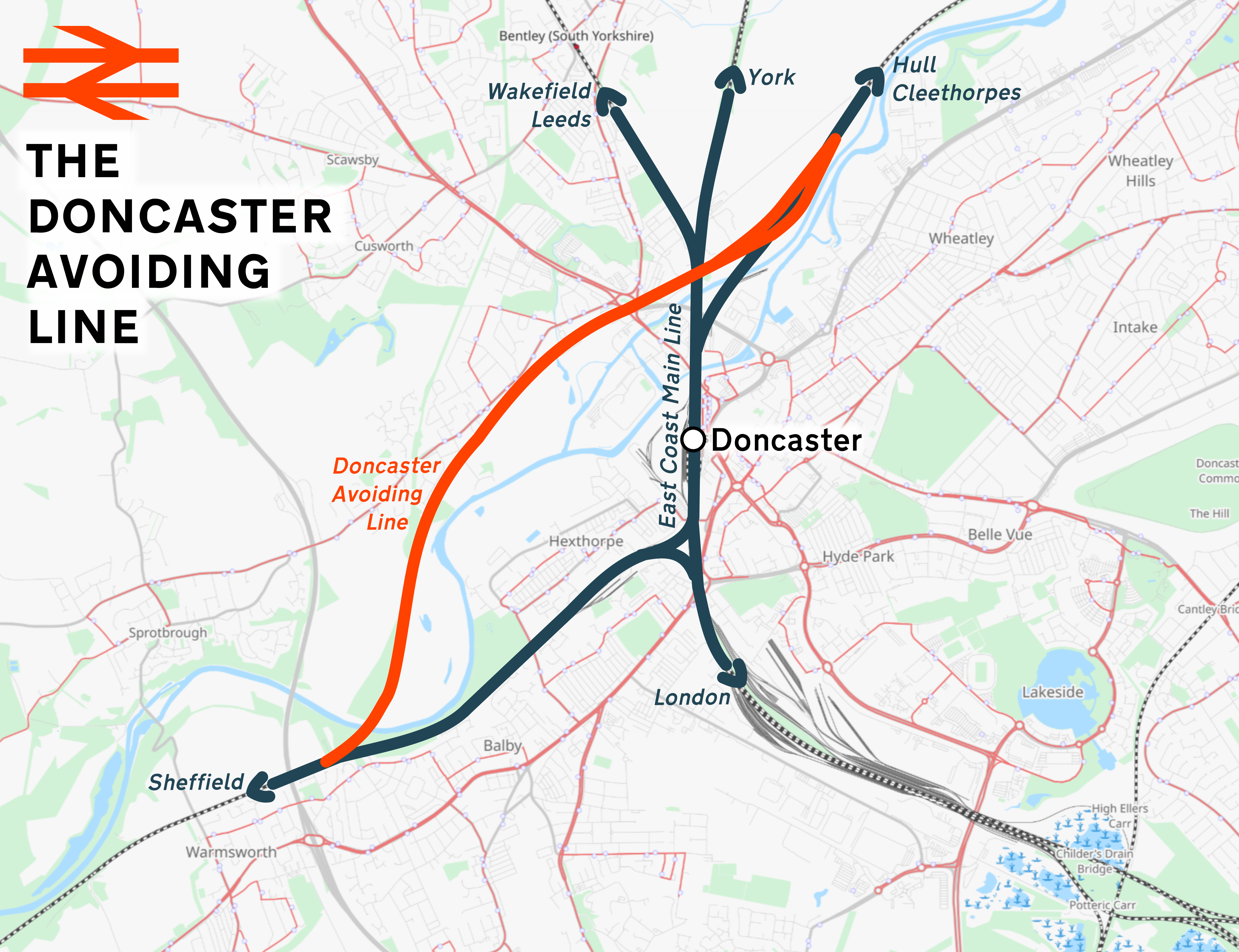
Route map (Click to expand)

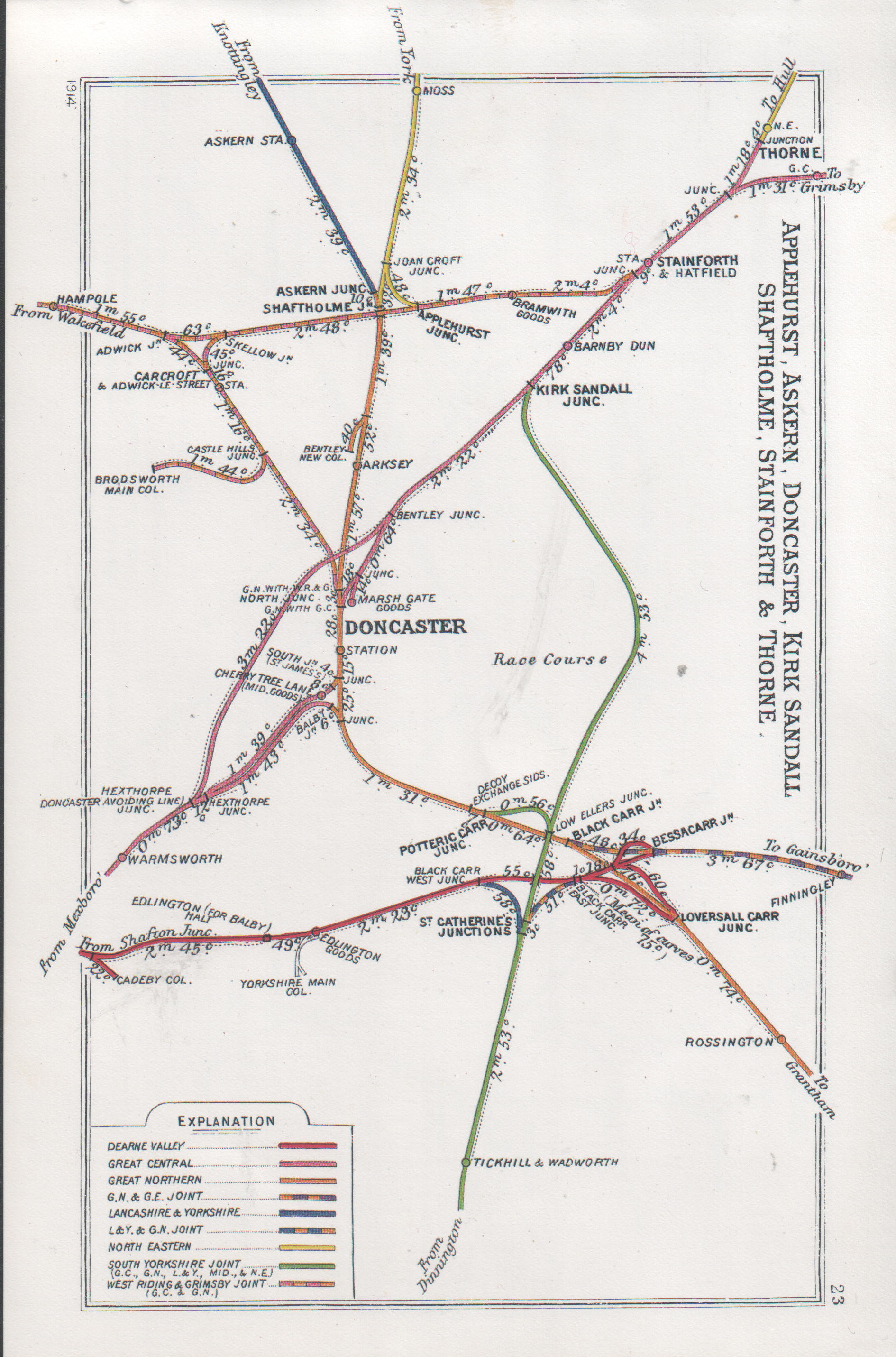
Railway Clearing House diagram of 1914 showing the Doncaster Avoiding Line

The Doncaster Avoiding Line is a railway line, which as its title suggests, avoids the town of Doncaster and routes goods traffic, principally coal and steel, away from the main line station where it would have to cross from the Sheffield line to the Hull or Cleethorpes lines and cause a bottleneck.

The line was promoted by the Great Central Railway and passed in an Act of Parliament in 1903 but work did not commence until 5 years later. Built mostly on embankment it opened in 1910. It was brought into use following the opening of Wath marshalling yard in 1907, and in preparation for the opening of Immingham Dock in 1912.

The Doncaster Avoiding Line runs from Bentley Junction on the Doncaster–Barnetby line to Hexthorpe Junction on the Swinton–Doncaster line. It is double track throughout with Bentley Junction being a 'flyover' junction and Hexthorpe Junction a 'flat' junction. The only junction in between was Sprotborough Junction, opened in 1916, where connections were made with the Hull and Barnsley and Great Central Joint Railway. These were two sets of 'double cross-overs' with the signal box between.

The line was worked under permissive block regulations, but these were suspended when passenger trains were to work over the line and absolute block substituted. There was a rising gradient towards Hexthorpe Junction which if trains were heavy and had been stood in the queue from Sprotborough Junction a banking locomotive was provided. This came from Mexborough depot and was usually a J11, N5 or L3 but sometimes a G.C. "Fish engine" which was on shed at the time. This locomotive also was used on the "Top Yard" to York Road goods and when it was away from its post Doncaster's passenger pilot locomotive would deputise if required

The line is still open and fulfils its original purpose, even more important today with faster trains on the East Coast Main Line in both freight and passenger.
