= Snaith and Pollington railway station =

Disused railway station in the East Riding of Yorkshire, England

Coordinates: 53.643°N 1.051°W

Snaith and Pollington

General information
- Location: Snaith, and Pollington, East Riding of Yorkshire; England
- Grid reference: SE622172
- Platforms: 2

Other information
- Status: Disused

History
- Original company: Hull and Barnsley and Great Central Joint Railway
Location

Snaith and Pollington railway station was a station on the Hull and Barnsley and Great Central Joint Railway between Sykehouse and Carlton. It was built with the line which opened in 1916, but the station never opened to passengers, being used for goods traffic only. Like most stations on this line, it was situated near the town of Snaith and the village of Pollington. It was renamed to Pollington in July 1951, to avoid confusion with Snaith railway station on the Wakefield to Goole line. Despite never opening to passengers, the station had the necessary facilities, and the two flanking platforms remained in situ until 1960.

The station was controlled by a signal box situated by the level crossing at the end of the platform, which lasted until the final closure of the line.

Preceding station	Disused railways	Following station
Sykehouse	Hull and Barnsley and Great Central Joint Railway	Carlton Towers
