= South Yorkshire Joint Railway =

Former British railway

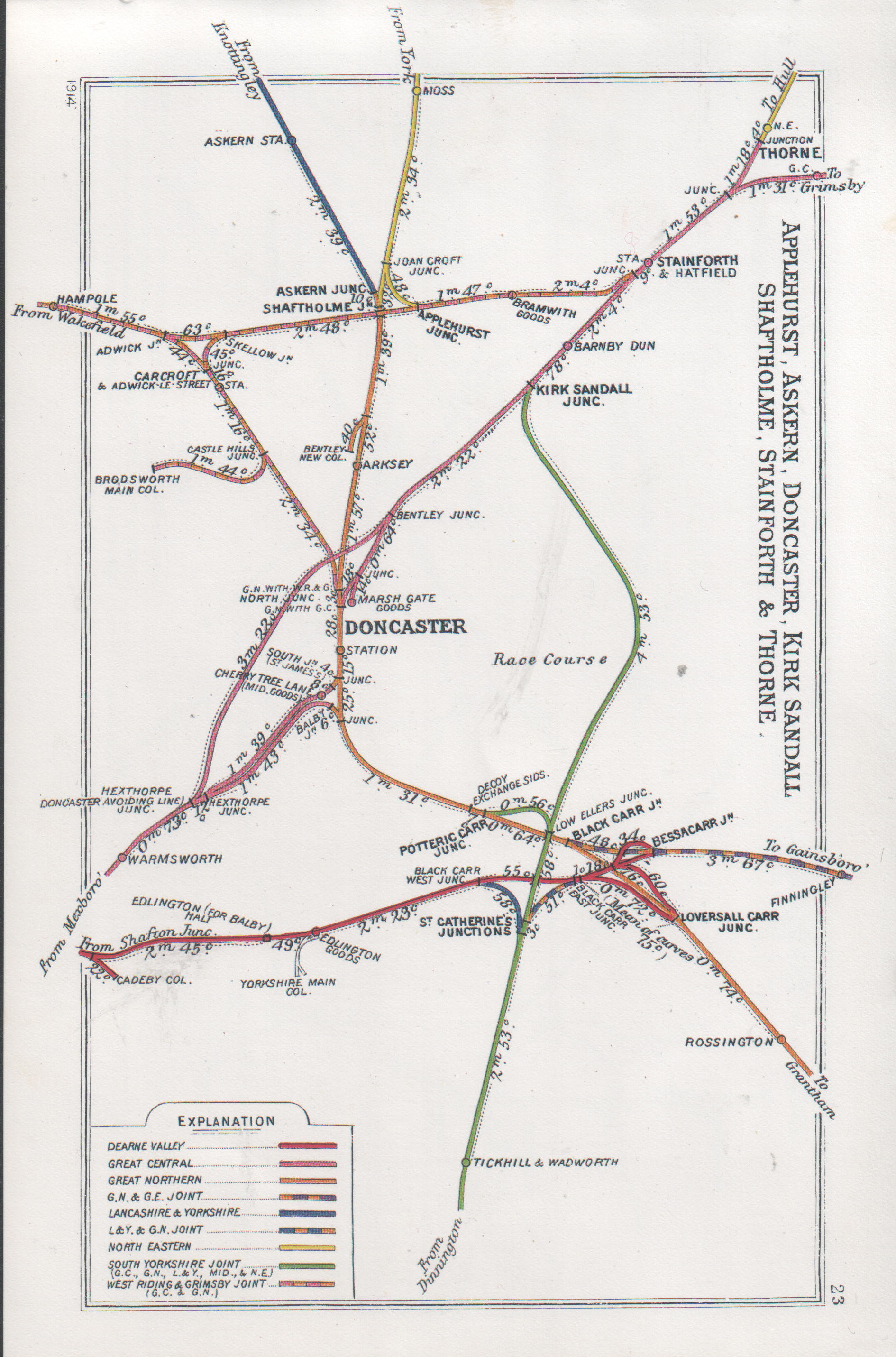
The northern end in 1914 (green)

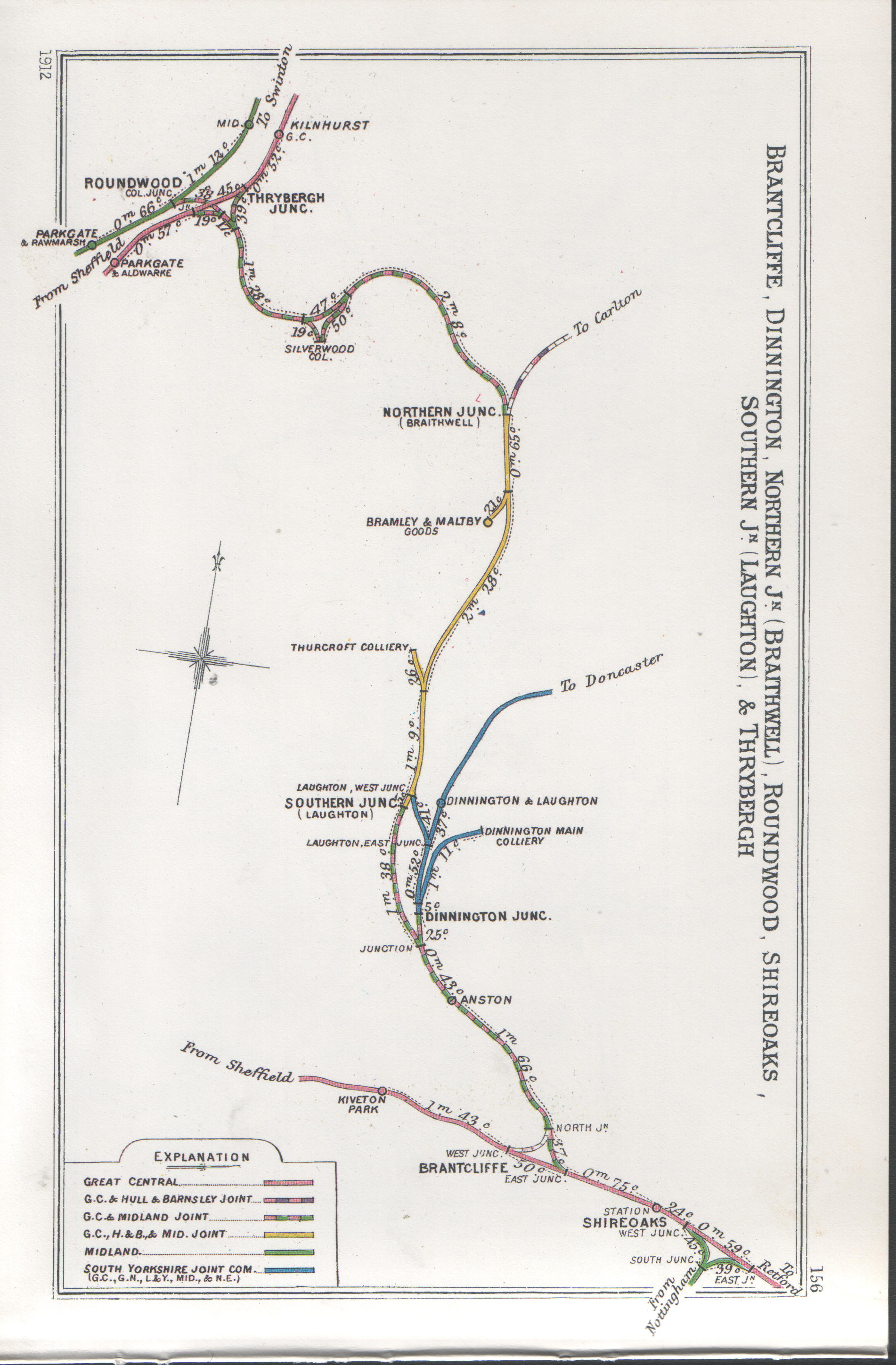
The southern end in 1912 (blue)

Railway Clearing House diagrams showing portions of the South Yorkshire Joint Railway

The South Yorkshire Joint Railway (SYJR) was a committee formed in 1903, between the Great Central Railway, the Great Northern Railway, the Lancashire and Yorkshire Railway, the Midland Railway and the North Eastern Railway to oversee the construction of a new railway in the Doncaster area of South Yorkshire, England. The five companies had equal rights over the line, each of the companies regularly working trains over it.

The line's passenger service terminated in 1929, but freight service continued, with eight collieries supplied at its height. Most of the collieries closed by the 1990s; but the line remained important for coal transportation both north and southwards to the Aire and Trent Valley power stations.

== History ==
=== Authorisation and operators ===
South Yorkshire Joint Railway Act 1903
- Act of Parliament
- Parliament of the United Kingdom
- Long title: An Act for enabling the North Eastern the Lancashire and Yorkshire the Great Northern the Midland and the Great Central Railway Companies to construct or take over certain railways in South Yorkshire authorised by the Shireoaks Laughton and Maltby Railway Act 1901 and the North Eastern Railway Act 1902 and to construct other railways and works for constituting a joint committee and for other purposes
- Citation: 3 Edw. 7. c. ccliii

Dates
- Royal assent: 14 August 1903

Other legislation
- Relates to: Shireoaks, Laughton and Maltby Railway Act 1901; North Eastern Railway Act 1902

Text of statute as originally enacted

Parliamentary permission to build the line was authorised with the passing of the South Yorkshire Joint Railway Act 1903 (3 Edw. 7. c. ccliii) on 14 August 1903, and the formation of the South Yorkshire Joint Line Committee; formed from the railway companies: North Eastern Railway (NER), Lancashire and Yorkshire Railway (L&YR), Great Northern Railway (GNR), Midland Railway (MR), and Great Central Railway (GCR).

Shireoaks, Laughton and Maltby Railway Act 1901
- Act of Parliament
- Parliament of the United Kingdom
- Long title: An Act for making a railway in the West Riding of the county of York from the Great Central Railway at Shireoaks to Maltby and for other purposes.
- Citation: 1 Edw. 7. c. ccxxx

Dates
- Royal assent: 9 August 1901

The Shireoaks, Laughton and Maltby Railway Act 1901 (1 Edw. 7. c. ccxxx), passed on 9 August 1901, incorporated an earlier scheme, the Shireoaks, Laughton and Maltby Railway, a venture of the GCR and MR companies; this was merged into the South Yorkshire Joint Railway by the 1903 act.

In the grouping of 1923, the MR and L&YR were grouped into the London, Midland and Scottish Railway (LMS), whilst the GCR, NER and GNR were all grouped into the London and North Eastern Railway (LNER). It thus remained an LMS-LNER joint line until nationalisation into British Railways in 1948.

=== Route ===
The line ran from Kirk Sandall Junction on the Great Central's Doncaster – Stainforth (former South Yorkshire Railway) to join up with the Great Central and Midland Joint Railway at Dinnington junction. The NER had access over the GCR from Hull, the MR had access from the Nottingham-Worksop line, over GCR metals from Shireoaks, the L&YR joined at St. Catherine's Junction from its Dearne Valley Railway and the GNR had connections to the south of Doncaster. As opened, the SYJR was 21 1/4 miles (34.2 km) in length, including its colliery branch lines and connections to the several lines it crossed in its path. It opened to freight on 1 January 1909, and to passengers on 1 December 1910. The capital cost was almost £411,000.

The line initially served Markham Main, Yorkshire Main, Dinnington Main, Maltby Main, Thurcroft and Harry Crofts collieries. The largest amount of coal traffic originating on the line was recorded in 1929, almost 3 million tons. This was the result of the new Firbeck and Harworth collieries coming into full production and their branch lines becoming part of the SYJR. This produced a net revenue for the SYJR of £81,000 – equal to about £5.3 million in 2020 prices, an astonishing figure for a line (excluding sidings) of just under 30 miles (48 km). By the end of 1929, capital expenditure on the SYJR had reached more than £710,000. As of 2010, only Maltby colliery was still producing coal, around 1.2 million tonnes a year according to the owners, but this last one closed in March 2013.

The route used encounters hilly country, and there are three viaducts, the largest being at the village of Slade Hooton one over the East Coast Main Line at Potteric Carr and the last being on the now lifted 3 1/2-mile (5.6 km) Harworth Branch passing over the A631 to the west of the village of Tickhill and, a rising gradient for most of its journey. The highest point of the line is in the vicinity of Brookhouse viaduct.

Maltby signal box which controlled train entry into and out of the colliery at Maltby is still operating and is the last mechanical Great Central type 5 designed signal box left on the line (built 1912), This box is actually within the town of Doncaster's boundary – so technically the box is the last mechanical signal box still in operation within the town of Doncaster.

=== Passenger services ===
There were three stations on the railway, these being Dinnington and Laughton, Maltby and Tickhill and Wadworth, all of them being situated away from the villages in their title. Four passenger trains each way daily were operated by the GCR and the GNR and these ran between Doncaster, over the Great Northern Main Line as far as Potteric Carr junction, and Shireoaks. Services called at all stations on the SYJR and Anston, on the Great Central and Midland Joint line. The joint passenger service operated for just one year before the GNR services were discontinued, reducing the service to two GCR trains with an extra one on Saturday. From April 1920, the service was extended to Worksop. Passenger traffic over the line was never great, with the largest total number of travellers – 60,220 – being recorded in 1913. The service became Saturdays-only in June 1917 until April 1920 but was suspended from April 1926 to July 1927 due to the 1926 general strike; this service was withdrawn altogether on 2 December 1929.

== Present day ==
As of October 2020, the line, although only single track, is an important freight railway line; now coal traffic has ceased there is very little traffic over the route but recent traffic has been the transfer to store of London North Eastern Railway Mark 4 coaches and DVTs in the Up side yard at Worksop. Network Rail operate their test trains over the route to and from Derby also. Route learning locomotives operate and the occasional off-route freight runs as well. There are plans to reroute the intermodal trains via Maltby over the South Yorkshire Joint line to the I-Port but no date has been given yet. Short spurs also connect the route with Doncaster Decoy Yard.

Doncaster International Railport, which opened in 2012 south-east of junction 3 of the M18 motorway, uses the line as its primary rail access point.
