= Anston =

Civil parish in South Yorkshire, England

- Civil Parish
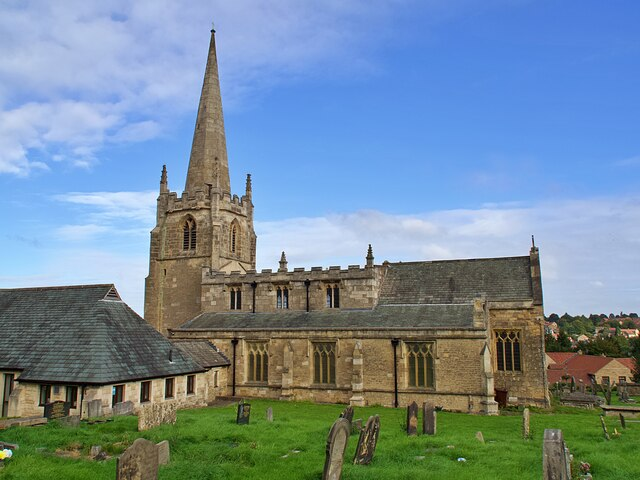
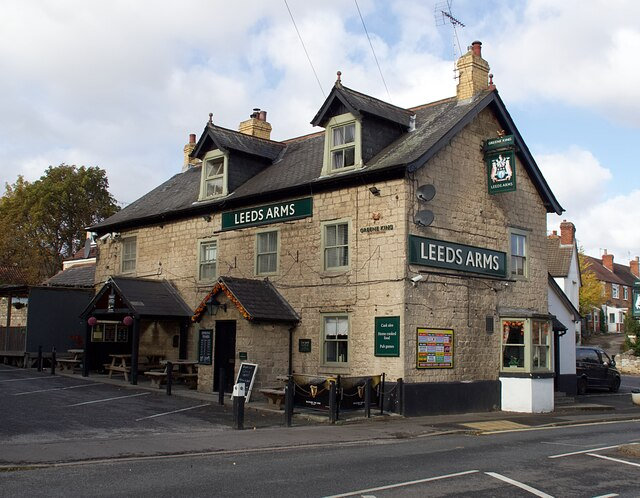
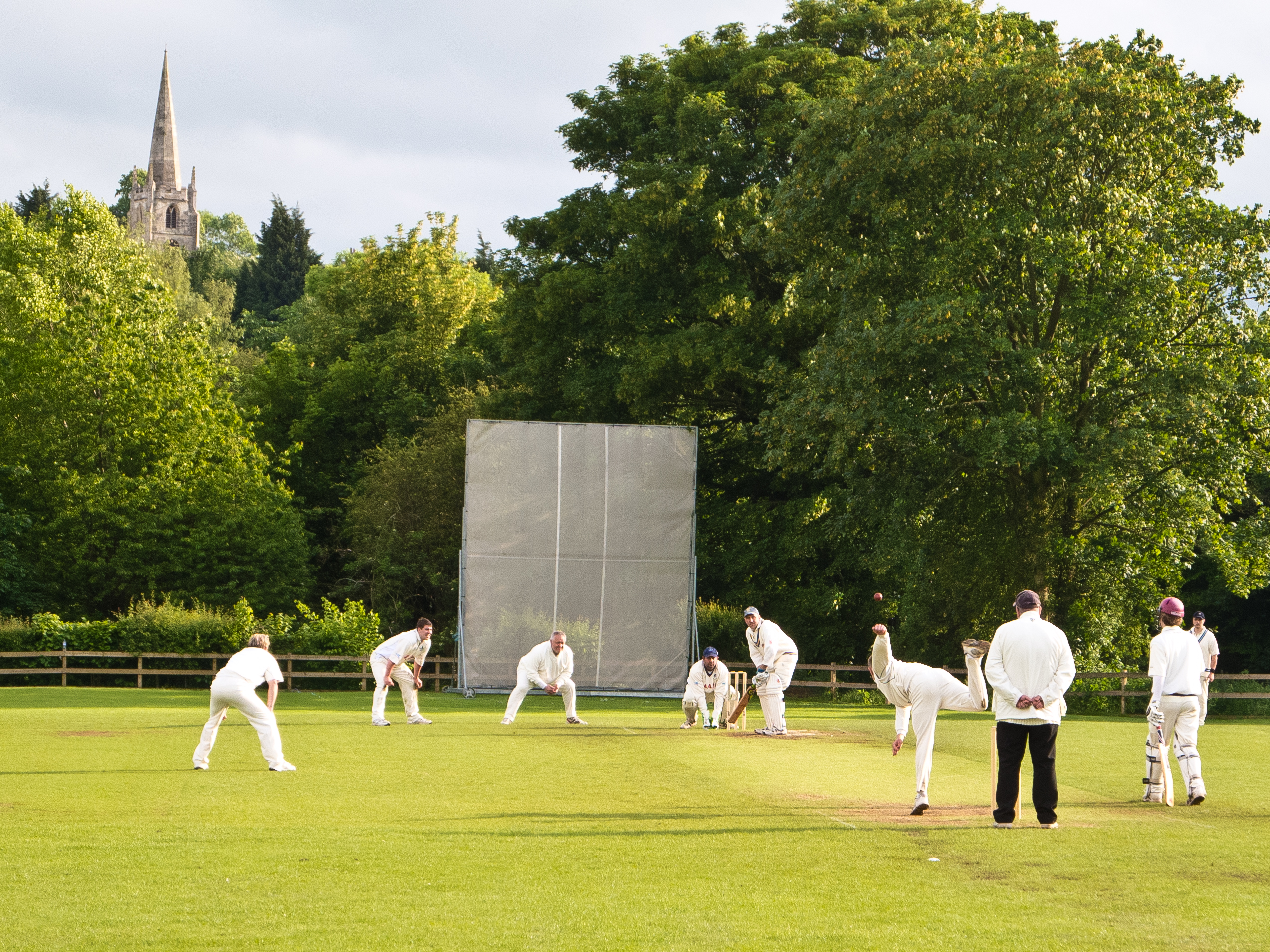
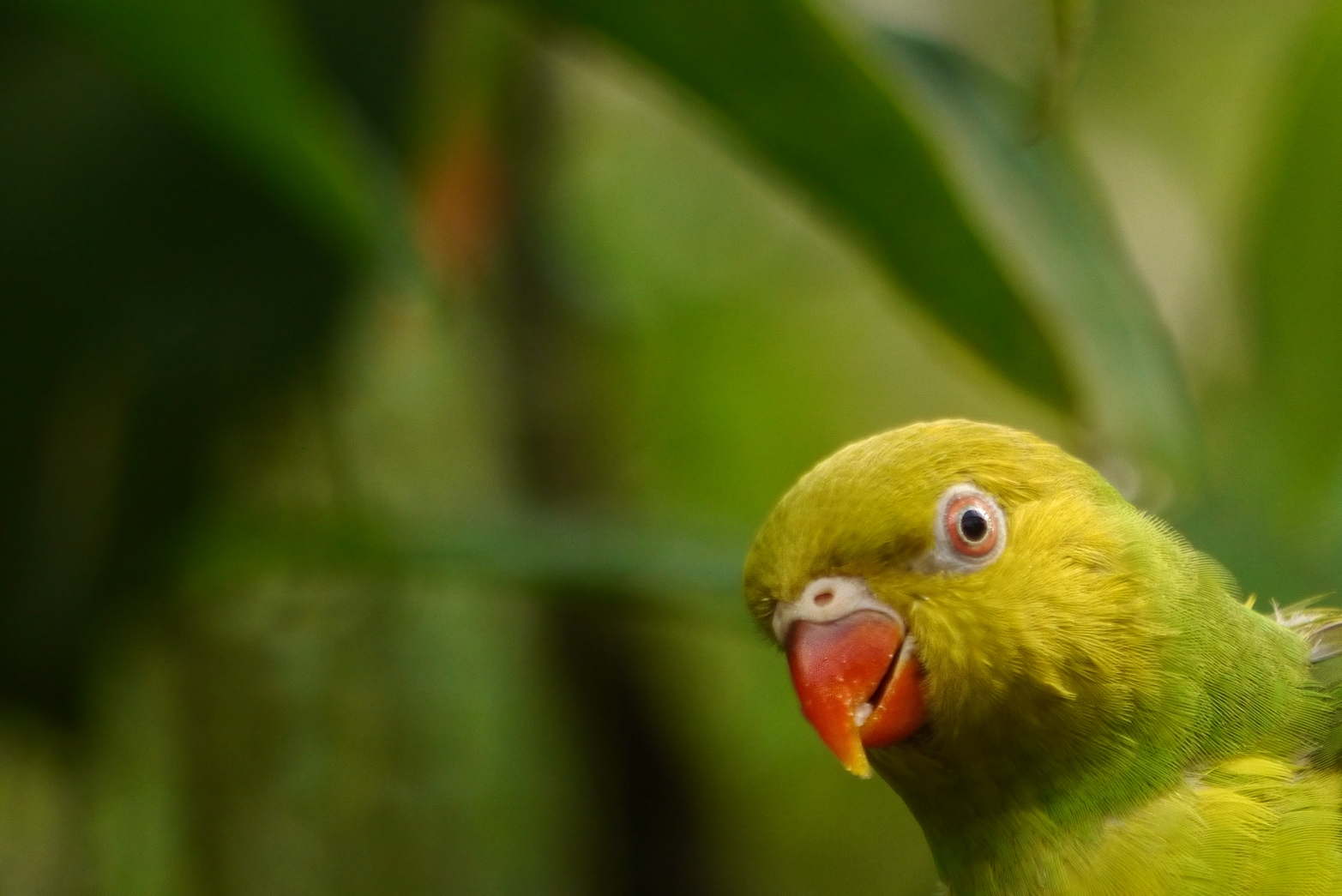
- Church of St James Leeds Arms Cricket Club Tropical Butterfly House

- Location within South Yorkshire
- Population: 9,217 (2011 census)
- OS grid reference: SK5386
- Civil parish: North and South Anston
- Metropolitan borough: Rotherham
- Metropolitan county: South Yorkshire
- Region: Yorkshire and the Humber
- Country: England
- Sovereign state: United Kingdom
- Post town: Sheffield
- Postcode district: S25
- Dialling code: 01909
- Police: South Yorkshire
- Fire: South Yorkshire
- Ambulance: Yorkshire
- UK Parliament: Rother Valley

Anston is a civil parish in South Yorkshire, England, formally known as North and South Anston. The parish of Anston consists of the settlements of North Anston and South Anston, which are separated by the Anston Brook.

== History ==
Anston, first recorded as Anestan, comes from the Old English āna stān, meaning "single or solitary stone". In the Domesday Book (1086) North and South Anston (Anestan and Litelanstan) were both held by Roger de Busli.

South Anston was an ancient parish in the wapentake of Strafforth and Tickhill in the West Riding of Yorkshire. It was a large parish, also known as Anston cum Membris, which also included North Anston and the township of Woodsetts. When civil parishes were created in 1866, Woodsetts became a separate civil parish and the remaining part of the parish became the civil parish of North and South Anston. In 1974 the parish was transferred to the Metropolitan Borough of Rotherham in the new county of South Yorkshire.

The original interest for the area (beyond Anston's agricultural uses) was the sandy "Anstone" Magnesian Limestone, but the real growth in Anston's population was more due to the sinking of the Dinnington Main Colliery in the early 20th century.

Anston railway station opened on 20 May 1912 and closed on 2 December 1929.

== North Anston ==
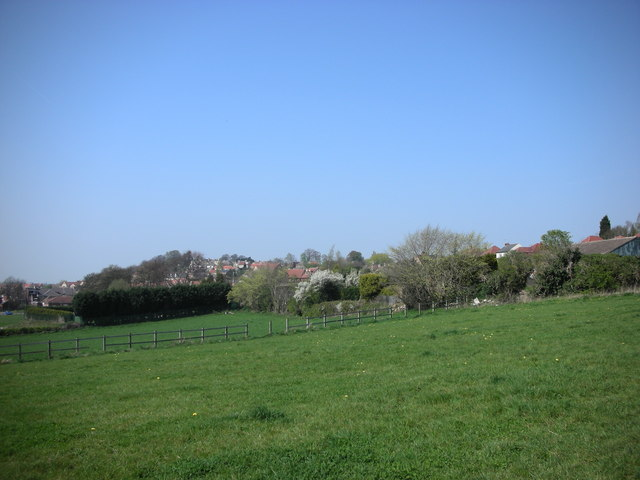
View of North Anston

North Anston is located at about 53° 21' 20" N, 1° 13' W and merges seamlessly into the town of Dinnington to the north. Today, it is largely a commuter base for Sheffield, Worksop and Rotherham, and is mainly made up of suburban housing estates. The picturesque "old village" at the south-east, however, retains its green, and the village wells. The surrounding landscape contains several disused quarries: the plantations to the east and Greenlands Park to the west being prime examples.

There are currently three pubs in North Anston: the Little Mester on Nursery Road, the Cutler on Woodsetts Road, and Anston Club on Main Street.

North Anston is home to the Tropical Butterfly House, Wildlife and Falconry Centre, a popular attraction seeing around 80,000 visitors every year.

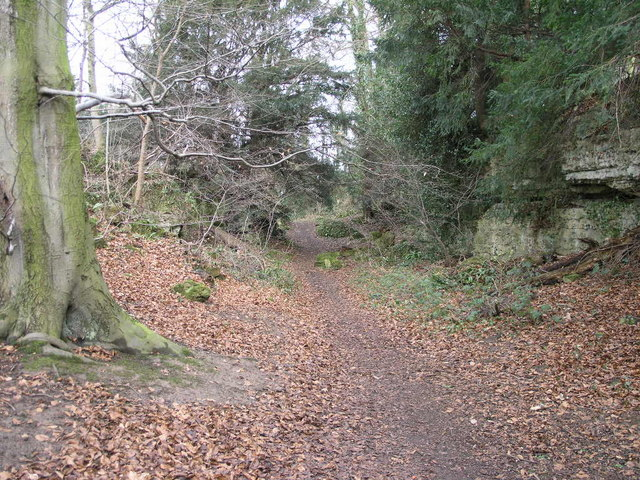
Path through Anston Stones Wood

It is also home to the limestone gorge of Anston Stones Wood, a Site of Special Scientific Interest. Anston stones wood stretches across the border of South Yorkshire and Nottinghamshire. The wood is believed to be part of a medieval smuggling route. Evidence of this has been found in the valley an example of this is Dead Man's Cave at Anston Gorge, a large cave carved out of the limestone used for hiding goods. An 1867 excavation of Dead Man's Cave pointed to Palaeolithic occupation, through the discovery of flint tools and a reindeer toe bone.

=== Public transport ===
North Anston is on main Rother Valley South bus routes to Dinnington, Worksop and Sheffield with links to Rotherham too. Stagecoach East Midlands (Stagecoach Bassetlaw) 19 and 19A provide services to Rotherham (Main Rotherham service), Worksop and Dinnington. First South Yorkshire covers Rotherham, Meadowhall, and Sheffield. The nearest railway station from North and South Anston is Kiveton Park and Kiveton Bridge. First South Yorkshire's X5 service provides a link between Anston and the railway station.

== South Anston ==
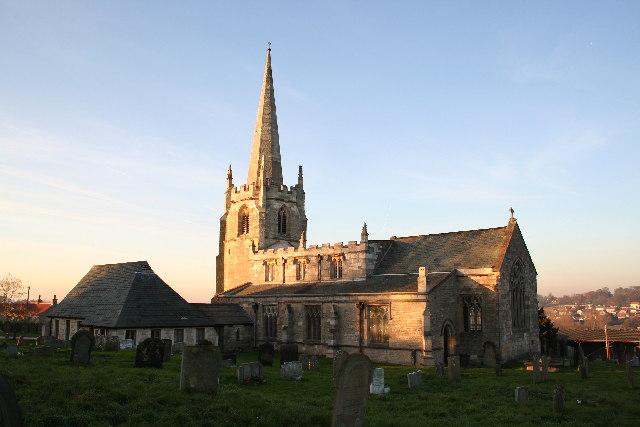
St James church, South Anston

South Anston is located at about 53°21′50″N 1°13′20″W, and is separated from North Anston by the Anston Brook, the A57 road and a freight railway-line. It is more rural than its northern partner. South Anston contains the parish church of St. James, and two Methodist chapels (dating from 1871 and 1935). It also contains Anston's working quarries which continue to mine stone for the building industry. Its location is ideal, as it is rural enough for enjoy a range walks from the village yet near enough to Sheffield to enjoy a wealth of infrastructure and transport links. There are two pubs in South Anston: the Loyal Trooper and the Leeds Arms.

To the south of the village lies the Chesterfield Canal. It was from a dock just to the south of Dog Kennel Lane that stone taken from quarries in South Anston was transported to London for the rebuilding of the Palace of Westminster following the fire in the 1830s. The blocks of stone were taken by horse-drawn sled to the canal, then taken down to West Stockwith where they were transferred to sailing barges for the journey to London.

== Governance ==
North and South Anston are part of Rother Valley Constituency, whose current Member of Parliament is Jake Richards MP (Labour).

Anston is part of the Anston and Woodsetts ward of Rotherham Metropolitan Borough Council. It is represented by three Councillors: Tim Baum-Dixon (Conservative), Drew Tarmey (Liberal Democrat) and John Blackham (Conservative).

== Sport ==
Anston Athletic F.C. competed in the FA Cup during the 1920s. Anston Villa are a new Junior Football Club who play their games at a Crowgate pitch in South Anston.

== See also ==
- Listed buildings in Anston
