= St James Church, Anston =

St James' Church, South Anston
- The Parish Church of Saint James, South Anston
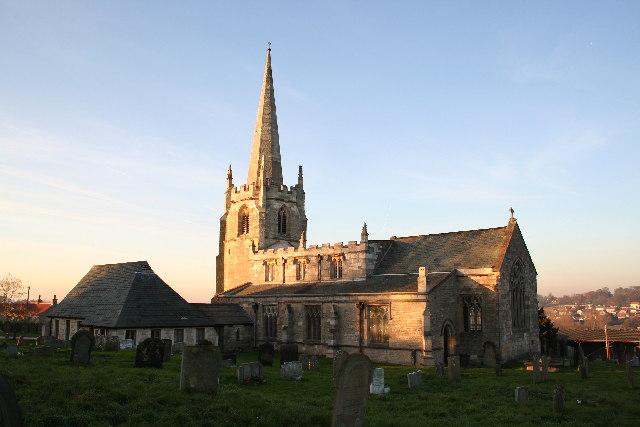
- St James' Church, South Anston
- St James' Church, South Anston
- 53°20′51.94″N 1°13′16.05″W
- OS grid reference: SK 51964 83704
- Location: Sheffield Road, South Anston, South Yorkshire, S25 5DT
- Country: England
- Denomination: Church of England

History
- Status: Active parish church
- Founded: 12th century

Architecture
- Style: Norman, Decorated Gothic, and Perpendicular Gothic

Administration
- Diocese: Diocese of Sheffield
- Archdeaconry: Archdeaconry of Doncaster
- Benefice: Anston

Listed Building – Grade I
- Designated: 29 July 1966
- Reference no.: 1192792

The Church of St James, South Anston is an active Church of England parish church located in South Anston, South Yorkshire, England. Originating in the 12th century, the building exhibits architectural work spanning the Norman, Decorated Gothic, and Perpendicular Gothic styles.

The church was built using locally quarried magnesium limestone—the same famous quarry stone selected in 1840 for rebuilding the Palace of Westminster. St James' was designated a Grade I listed building on 29 July 1966.

== History ==
=== Monastic foundation and middle ages ===
The earliest stone fabric of St James' dates to the mid-to-late 12th century. The church was established as a chapel of ease under the jurisdiction of the Louth Park Abbey and later tied to the Prebend of Anston within York Minster.

During the 14th century, the building underwent extensive reconstruction in the Decorated style, which added the north aisle, enlarged the chancel, and erected the distinctive recessed western spire.

=== Post-Reformation and Victorian restoration ===
Following the English Reformation, tithes passed through lay impropriators, notably the Dukes of Leeds (whose ancestral seat was at nearby Kiveton Park and Hornby Castle).

By the mid-19th century, the church structure had fallen into state of partial disrepair. Between 1871 and 1874, a comprehensive Victorian restoration was undertaken under the direction of Sheffield architect Charles Hadfield. The restoration re-pitched the nave roof, replaced decayed window tracery, cleared non-medieval gallery seating, and exposed original Norman masonry around the south door.

== Architecture ==
St James' Church is built of fine-grained, pale cream Anston magnesium limestone ashlar with stone slate roofs. The architectural layout comprises a three-stage west tower with an octagonal recessed spire, a three-bay nave with a north aisle, a south porch, and a two-bay chancel with an adjacent north vestry.

=== West Tower and Spire ===
The 14th-century west tower is a prominent regional landmark. Constructed in three stages, it features angle buttresses, pointed two-light belfry windows with tracery, and an embattled parapet with gargoyles. Rising above the tower is a slender, octagonal broach spire featuring two tiers of lucarnes.

=== Exterior and Interior ===
The south porch incorporates late 12th-century Norman architectural remnants, including a round-arched doorway with chevron and billet molding. The north arcade features octagonal piers supporting double-chamfered pointed arches dating from the early 14th century. The chancel features a 14th-century double piscina with carved trefoil arches set into the south wall and an East Window depicting St James.

== Monuments and fittings ==
Located in the north aisle is a worn 14th-century stone effigy depicting a civilian holding a heart, believed to represent a medieval benefactor of the church. A 14th-century octagonal stone font bowl resting on a cylindrical stem. The church yard contains a Grade II listed stone cross war memorial dedicated to local villagers lost during the First World War and Second World War.

== See also ==
- Grade I listed buildings in South Yorkshire
- Listed buildings in Anston
