= Listed buildings in Anston =

Anston is a civil parish in the Metropolitan Borough of Rotherham, South Yorkshire, England. The parish contains 18 listed buildings that are recorded in the National Heritage List for England. Of these, one is listed at Grade I, the highest of the three grades, and the others are at Grade II, the lowest grade. The parish contains the villages of North Anston and South Anston, and an area of countryside to the southeast. The Chesterfield Canal runs through this area, and buildings associated with it are listed. The other listed buildings include houses, farmhouses and farm buildings, a church, a road bridge, and two railway bridges.

== Key ==
Grade	Criteria
I	Particularly important buildings of more than special interest
II	Buildings of national importance and special interest

== Buildings ==
Name and location	Photograph	Date	Notes	Grade
St James' Church; 53.34770°N 1.22086°W		14th century	The tower and the clerestory were added in the 15th century, and the church was restored in the 19th century. It is built in limestone, and has roofs of lead and green slate. The church consists of a nave with a clerestory, north and south aisles, a chancel with a south vestry, and a west tower. The tower is in Perpendicular style, and has diagonal buttresses rising to crocketed pinnacles, a west doorway, a three-light west window, clock faces on the north and west, two-light bell openings, an embattled octagonal parapet, and a recessed octagonal spire with a weathervane. The clerestory has embattled parapets and crocketed pinnacles, and the east window has five lights.	I
South Anston Manor House; 53.34694°N 1.22208°W	—	Early 17th century	A manorial farmhouse on a chamfered plinth, with quoins, and a roof of tile and pantile with moulded gable copings and shaped kneelers. There are two storeys and attics, and an L-shaped plan, with a four-bay main range and a rear wing. On the front is a two-storey porch that has an opening with a chamfered quoined surround. The windows on the front are mullioned and transomed, and those at the rear have been altered. On the left gable end are external stone steps.	II
18 The Green, North Anston; 53.35583°N 1.22083°W	—	17th century	The farmhouse, which has been altered, is in limestone, with chamfered quoins, a floor band, and a pantile roof with coped gables and shaped kneelers. There are two storeys and attics, and two bays. On the front is a gabled porch with a moulded surround. Most of the windows are mullioned, some with mullions removed, and some with hood moulds.	II
7 Hillside, North Anston; 53.35494°N 1.22161°W	—	Early 18th century	A house in roughcast limestone, with chamfered quoins, a floor band, an eaves cornice, and a Welsh slate roof with coped gables and shaped kneelers. There are two storeys and an attic, and three bays. The central doorway has a moulded surround, and a broken segmental pediment on consoles. In the ground floor are a sash window and a casement window with architraves, and the upper floor contains mullioned casement windows.	II
Brancliffe Grange Farmhouse; 53.32935°N 1.17972°W	—	Early 18th century	The farmhouse is rendered, and has a pantile roof with coped gables and shaped kneelers. There are three storeys, three bays, and a rear wing. The central doorway is blocked with an inserted window, and has a peaked cornice on shaped brackets. It is flanked by bay windows, and the other windows are mullioned.	II
Barn north of Brancliffe Grange Farmhouse; 53.32973°N 1.17978°W	—	Early 18th century	The barn is in stone, with quoins, stone slate eaves courses, and a pantile roof with a weathervane. There are two storeys and seven bays. The barn contains wagon entries, slit vents, square hatches, and a window, and in the left return is a doorway with plinth blocks, impost blocks, and a segmental-arched soffit to the lintel.	II
Mulberry Farmhouse and outbuilding 53.35537°N 1.22060°W	—	Early to mid 18th century	The farmhouse and outbuilding are in limestone, with quoins, and pantile roofs with coped gables and kneelers. The house has two storeys and an attic, and five bays, and a central doorway with a pediment. The windows are sashes, those in the ground floor with moulded surrounds, and there is a roof dormer. The outbuilding is recessed on the right, and has three doorways with chamfered surrounds, a blocked triangular vent, and an upper floor doorway.	II
Deep Carrs Farmhouse; 53.33635°N 1.17088°W	—	Mid 18th century	A limestone farmhouse, with quoins, and a pantile roof with chamfered gable copings and shaped kneelers. There are two storeys and attics, and an L-shaped plan, consisting of a two-bay range, with a rear wing on the right, and an outshut in the angle. The doorway has a plain surround, and the windows are casements.	II
Laurel Bank; 53.34888°N 1.22451°W	—	Mid 18th century	A house that was later extended and divided, it is in limestone on a plinth, with chamfered quoins, and a Welsh slate roof with coped gables and shaped kneelers. There are three storeys and four bays, The doorway has an architrave, and the windows are a mix of sashes and casements. The right bay is an addition, it is angled out, and has an embattled parapet.	IIt
The Gate House; 53.35591°N 1.22049°W	—	18th century	The house, which was extended in the early 19th century, is in limestone, and has roofs of slate and pantile with coped gables. Both parts have two storeys. The earlier part has quoins and five bays. On the front is a gabled porch, a doorway, and casement windows. The extension at the rear has three bays, a doorway with a fanlight, an archivolt, a keystone, and an open pediment, and the windows are sashes.	II
Anston Bridge; 53.35345°N 1.22673°W	—	Late 18th century (probable)	The bridge carries Mill Lane over Anston Brook. It is in limestone and consists of three round arches, the middle arch the largest. The bridge has a band, a coped parapet, keystones, and projecting piers with domed caps. The wing walls end in similar piers.	II
Bridge 37, Turnerwood Lock and overflow 53.32551°N 1.17665°W		Late 18th century	The bridge, lock and overflow structure are on the Chesterfield Canal. The bridge is in brick, it consists of a single basket arch, and has voussoirs, a coped parapet curving down on each side, and abutment walls ending in rounded piers. To the south is an overflow channel with a round brick arch, and the lock to the west has stone walls with some brick.	II
Turnerwood Flight of locks 53.32598°N 1.18199°W		Late 18th century	A flight of six locks on the Chesterfield Canal. They are mainly in stone, with some brickwork.	II
16 Main Street, North Anston; 53.35450°N 1.21862°W	—	Early 19th century	A limestone house on a plinth, with a hipped tile roof. There are two storeys, and fronts of two bays. The central doorway has plinth blocks, an architrave and a pediment, and the windows are sashes. At the rear is a tall round-arched stair window with projecting impost blocks and a keystone.	II
High House; 53.35458°N 1.21882°W	—	Early 19th century	The house is in limestone with a hipped pantile roof. There are three storeys and two bays. The central doorway has plinth blocks, an architrave and a pediment, and the windows are sashes with architraves. At the rear is a tall full-height round-arched stair window with projecting impost blocks and a keystone.	II
Lodge Farmhouse; 53.35504°N 1.22456°W	—	Early 19th century	The farmhouse is in limestone with quoins, an eaves cornice, and a pantile roof with shaped kneelers. There are two storeys and attics, five bays, and a wing and an outshut at the rear. The central doorway has a moulded surround.	II
Railway bridge about 1075 metres east of Brancliffe East Junction; 53.32651°N 1.17563°W	—	c. 1849	The bridge was built by the Manchester, Sheffield and Lincolnshire Railway to carry its line over a farm track. It is in limestone with a brick soffit, and consists of a single round arch. The bridge has voussoirs, an impost band, and buttresses. The wing walls sweep out and end in low piers.	II
Railway bridge about 840 metres east of Brancliffe East Junction; 53.32704°N 1.17904°W	—	c. 1849	The bridge was built by the Manchester, Sheffield and Lincolnshire Railway to carry its line over a farm track. It is in limestone with a brick soffit, and consists of a single round arch. The bridge has voussoirs, an impost band, and buttresses. The wing walls sweep out and end in low piers.	II
