= Barmby railway station =

Disused railway station in the East Riding of Yorkshire, England

Barmby
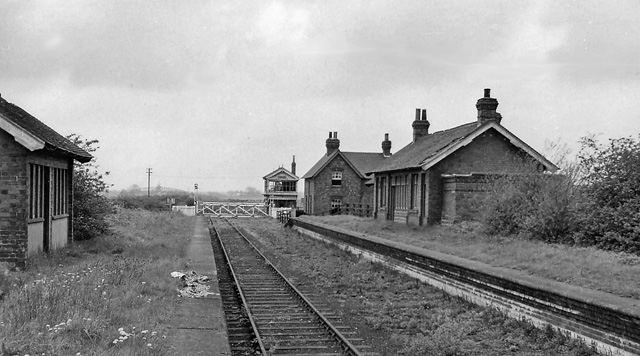
- Station in 1961

General information
- Location: Barmby on the Marsh, East Riding of Yorkshire; England
- Coordinates: 53.745300°N 0.942000°W
- Grid reference: SE697281
- Platforms: 2

Other information
- Status: Disused

History
- Original company: Hull, Barnsley and West Riding Junction Railway
- Pre-grouping: Hull and Barnsley Railway
- Post-grouping: London and North Eastern Railway

Key dates
- 1885: Opened
- 1 January 1932: Closed
Location

Barmby railway station was a station on the Hull and Barnsley Railway, and served the village of Barmby on the Marsh in the East Riding of Yorkshire, England.

| Preceding station | Disused railways | Following station |
|---|---|---|
| Drax Abbey | Hull and Barnsley Railway | South Howden |
