= Drax Abbey railway station =

Disused railway station in North Yorkshire, England

Drax Abbey
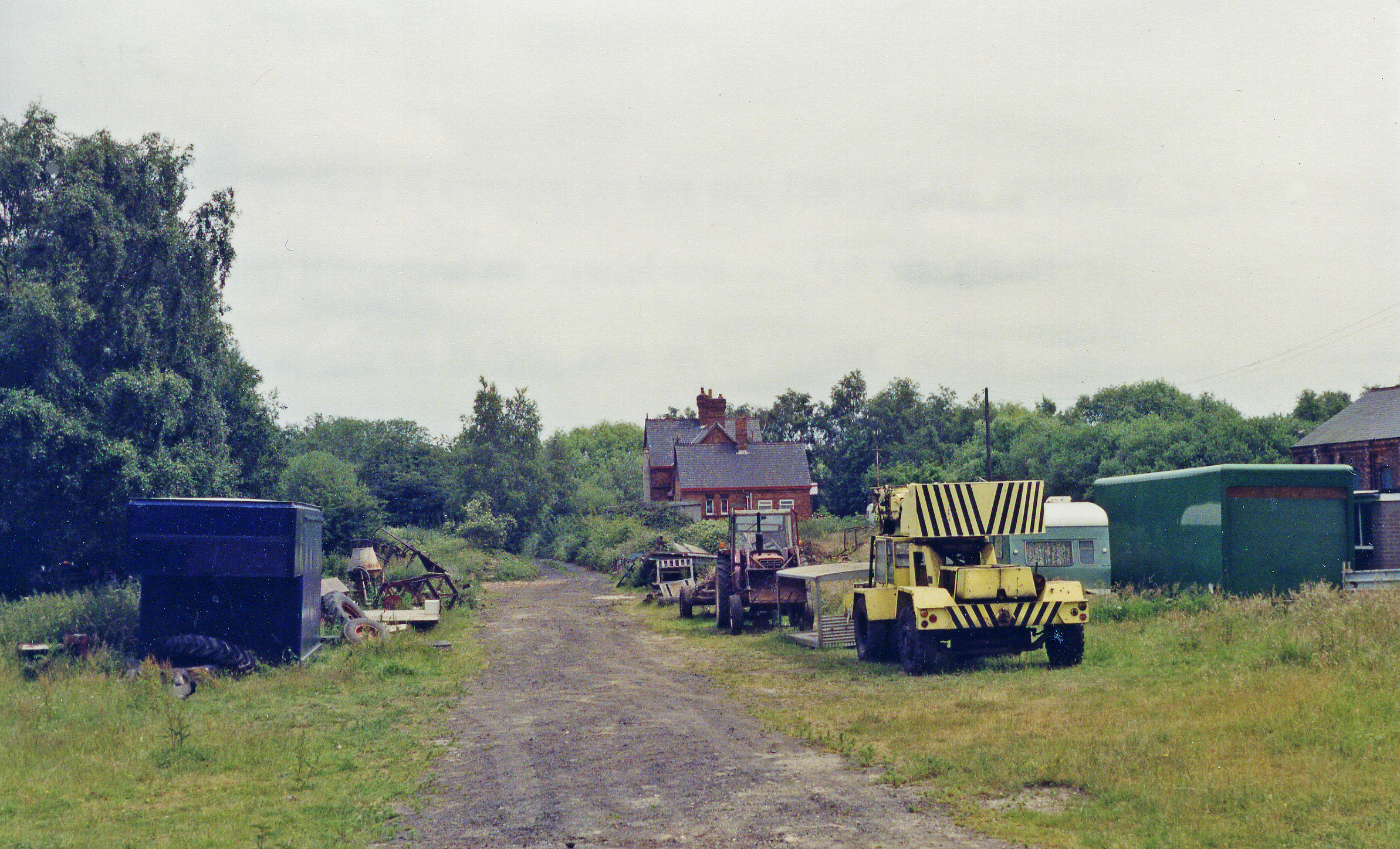
- Site of the station in 1992

General information
- Location: Drax, North Yorkshire; England
- Coordinates: 53.7304°N 0.9894°W
- Grid reference: SE667264
- Platforms: 2

Other information
- Status: Disused

History
- Original company: Hull, Barnsley and West Riding Junction Railway
- Pre-grouping: Hull and Barnsley Railway
- Post-grouping: London and North Eastern Railway

Key dates
- 1885: Opened
- 1932: Closed
Location

Drax Abbey railway station was a station on the Hull and Barnsley Railway, and served the village of Drax in North Yorkshire, England.

The station opened on 27 July 1885 and closed on 1 January 1932.

Preceding station	Disused railways	Following station
Carlton Towers	Hull and Barnsley Railway	Barmby
