= List of constituents of the Southern Railway =

The Southern Railway in the United Kingdom was one of the "Big Four" railway companies set up after the 1923 Grouping. This list sets out the constituents of the Company.

== Constituent companies ==
- The London and South Western Railway (LSWR) route mileage 1,020 miles (1,642 km)
- The London, Brighton and South Coast Railway (LBSCR) 457 1/4 miles (736 km)
- The combined systems of the South Eastern Railway and the London, Chatham and Dover Railway, under the South Eastern and Chatham Railways' Managing Committee (SECR) 637 3/4 miles (1026 km). These concerns had formed a working union to operate their services under a managing committee on 1 January 1899.

== Subsidiary companies ==
=== Independently operated lines ===
- Freshwater, Yarmouth and Newport Railway 12 miles (19 km)
- Isle of Wight Railway 15 1/4 miles (24 km)
- Isle of Wight Central Railway 28 1/2 miles (46 km)
- Bere Alston and Callington section of the Plymouth, Devonport and South Western Junction Railway 9 3/4 miles (16 km)

=== Non-working companies ===
- Originally leased to or worked by LSWR
  - Bridgwater Railway 7 1/4 miles (12 km)
  - Lee-on-the-Solent Railway 3 miles (5 km)
  - North Cornwall Railway 52 1/2 miles (84 km)
  - Plymouth and Dartmoor Railway (portion used by LSWR) 2 1/4 miles (4 km)
  - Plymouth, Devonport and South Western Junction Railway (except Bere Alston and Callington section as above) 19 1/2 miles (31 km)
  - Sidmouth Railway 8 1/4 miles (13 km)
- Originally leased to or worked by LBSCR
  - Brighton and Dyke Railway 4 3/4 miles (8 km)
  - Hayling Railway 5 miles (8 km)
- Originally leased to or worked by SER or LCDR
  - Cranbrook and Paddock Wood Railway 11 miles 24 chains (18.19 km)
  - Crowhurst, Sidley and Bexhill Railway 4 miles 40 chains (7.24 km)
  - London and Greenwich Railway 3 3/4 miles (6 km)
  - Mid Kent Railway (Bromley to St Mary Cray) 2 1/2 miles (4 km)

=== Other railways ===
- Victoria Station and Pimlico Railway (in which the Great Western Railway and the London and North Western Railway were also parties)
- Lynton and Barnstaple Railway: not covered by the Railways Act 1921, but absorbed by the LSWR. Narrow gauge (1 ft 11 1/2 in (597 mm)) 19 1/4 miles (31 km)
- Several light railways, including the Basingstoke and Alton Light Railway, though other candidate lines remained independent, such as the Kent and East Sussex Railway

== Joint companies ==
- In 1923, now comprised wholly in the SR:
  - Croydon and Oxted Joint Railway 12 1/2 miles (20 km (was LBSCR/SE&CR joint)
  - Dover and Deal Railway 8 1/2 miles (14 km) (was SE&CR)
  - Epsom and Leatherhead Railway 3 3/4 miles (6 km) (was LBSCR/LSWR joint)
  - Portsmouth and Ryde Joint Railway (including a ferry) 8 1/2 miles (14 km) (was LBSCR/LSWR joint)
  - Tooting, Merton and Wimbledon Railway 5 3/4 miles (9 km) (was LBSCR/LSWR joint)
  - Woodside and South Croydon Railway 2 1/2 miles (4 km) (was LBSCR/SE&CR joint)
- In 1923, in association with other companies:
  - East London Railway 5 miles (8 km) (shared with London and North Eastern Railway (LNER) and Metropolitan Railway)
  - Easton and Church Hope Railway 3 1/2 miles (6 km) (joint with Great Western Railway (GWR))
  - Somerset and Dorset Joint Railway 105 miles (168 km) (joint with London, Midland and Scottish Railway (LMS))
  - West London Extension Railway 5 1/4 miles (8 km) (shared with GWR and LMS)
  - Weymouth and Portland Railway 5 1/2 miles (9 km) (joint with GWR)

== See also ==
- List of railway companies involved in the 1923 grouping
