= Sykehouse railway station =

Disused railway station in South Yorkshire, England

Coordinates: 53.643°N 1.051°W

Sykehouse

General information
- Location: Sykehouse, Doncaster; England
- Grid reference: SE622172
- Platforms: 2

Other information
- Status: Disused

History
- Original company: Hull and Barnsley and Great Central Joint Railway
Location

Sykehouse railway station was a station on the Hull and Barnsley and Great Central Joint Railway between Thorpe-in-Balne and Snaith and Pollington. It was built with the line which opened on 1 May 1916, but the station never opened to passengers. Like most stations on this line, it was situated on the edge of Sykehouse some distance from the village centre, in the hamlet of Topham, just south of where the railway crossed the River Went. Despite never opening to passengers, the station had the necessary facilities, and the two flanking platforms remained in situ until 1960.

The station was controlled by a signal box situated by the level crossing at the end of the platform, which lasted until the final closure of the line.

Preceding station	Disused railways	Following station
Thorpe-in-Balne	Hull and Barnsley and Great Central Joint Railway	Snaith and Pollington
