= Dinnington Main Colliery =

Former coal mine in South Yorkshire, England

Coordinates: 53.370°N 1.209°W

Dinnington Main Colliery was a coal mine situated in the village of Dinnington, near Rotherham, South Yorkshire, England.

Until the coming of the colliery Dinnington was a mainly agricultural village with a small amount of quarrying in the area.

In 1899 preparations were being made by the Sheffield Coal Company to sink a new colliery at Dinnington. The company did not have the resources to complete the work and entered into a partnership with the Sheepbridge Coal and Iron Co and this joint company, the Dinnington Main Colliery Company, came into being in 1900. The colliery commenced sinking in 1902 and reached the Barnsley seam of coal in the summer of 1904. The first coal was drawn to the surface the following year which is also when the mine gained its second shaft.

Rail connection for the colliery was eventually made by the South Yorkshire Joint Railway (SYJR) when its line opened in January 1909. The SYJR was a five way joint line with connections to ports and towns in the area and beyond.

At the time of the 1946 nationalisation of the coal industry the colliery was in the hands of Amalgamated Denaby Collieries, based at Denaby Main, near Doncaster. Following nationalisation the colliery became part of the National Coal Board.

The colliery stopped production in October 1991, and was closed in 1992 with the loss of over 1,000 jobs. At the start of the 21st century, the former colliery site was subject to one of the largest former coal mine reclamation schemes that Yorkshire had seen. Johnston Press, a regional publisher and printer, sited a £60 million printing press on the site in 2006.

Nearby St Leonard's Church in Dinnington, has a mining memorial commemorating the 74 miners who died whilst working at Dinnington Main, though the eventual tally of the dead is disputed by some researchers.
