= Seaforth and Sefton Junction Railway =

The Seaforth and Sefton Junction Railway (S&SJR) was a proposed new railway in Merseyside (at that time Lancashire) that would have connected the northern end of the Liverpool Overhead Railway (LOR) at Seaforth Sands with the Southport and Cheshire Lines Extension Railway (S&CLER) at Sefton and Maghull. Authorised on 14 August 1903 by the Seaforth and Sefton Junction Railway Act 1903 (3 Edw. 7 c. cclviii), the railway was to have comprised a line 4 miles 3.11 furlongs (7.06 km) in length, and another of 3.34 furlongs (670 m), with a share capital of £270,000. The authorising Act allowed electric trains to be used, which could have operated as an extension of the LOR.

The S&CLER was worked by the Cheshire Lines Committee (CLC), but of the three joint partners in the CLC, only the Great Central Railway (GCR) expressed any support for the S&SJR. Part IV of the Great Central Railway Act 1904 (4 Edw. 7. c. xcvi, 22 July 1904) authorised deviations of the originally-proposed S&SJR line, plus some additional connecting lines and branches. Under the terms of the Great Central Railway (Various Powers) Act 1909 (9 Edw. 7. c. lxxxv, 16 August 1909), the S&SJR was leased to the GCR, which invested money in the project.

Although some land was purchased, no lines were built and despite further legislation in 1911 (1 & 2 Geo. 5. c. xix, 2 June 1911), 1912 (2 & 3 Geo. 5. c. lviii, 7 August 1912) and 1915 (5 & 6 Geo. 5. c. xxiii, 24 June 1915) to grant extensions of time, authorise more money to be raised and other matters, the project was eventually abandoned, but not before the S&SJR was named in the Railways Act 1921 as a subsidiary of the London and North Eastern Railway, created by that Act.
