= Shireoaks railway station =

Railway station in Nottinghamshire, England

Shireoaks
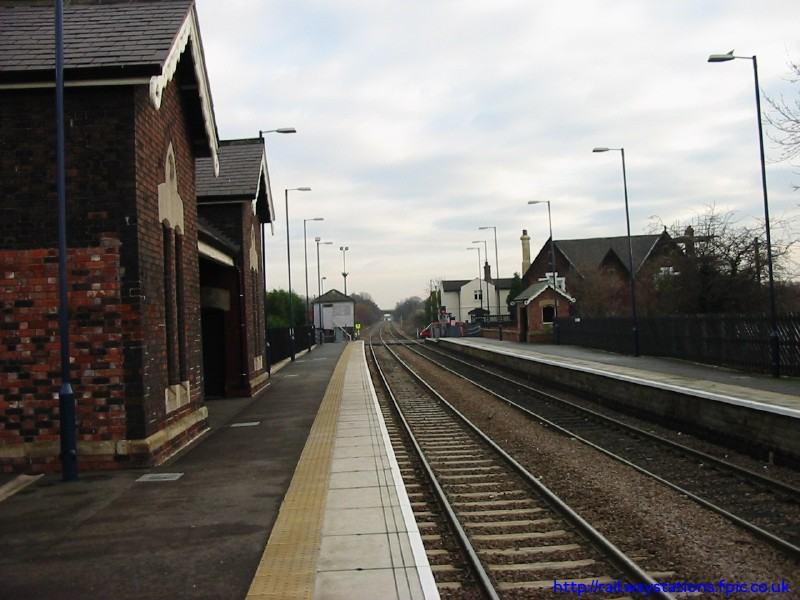
- The station in 2004

General information
- Location: Shireoaks, Bassetlaw; England
- Coordinates: 53.325°N 1.168°W
- Grid reference: SK555811
- Manager: Northern Trains
- Platforms: 2

Other information
- Station code: SRO
- Classification: DfT category F2

History
- Opened: 16 July 1849

Passengers
- 2021/22: ▲28,278
- 2022/23: ▲35,526
- 2023/24: ▲42,882
- 2024/25: ▲54,282
- 2025/26: ▲61,132
Location
Notes
- Passenger statistics from the Office of Rail and Road

Shireoaks railway station serves the village of Shireoaks in Nottinghamshire, England. It was opened by the Sheffield and Lincolnshire Junction Railway in 1849. The station is 13 3/4 miles (22.1 kilometres) east of Sheffield on the Sheffield-Gainsborough Central service.

== Facilities ==
The station is unstaffed and has limited ticket provision - all tickets must be purchased prior to travel, at the single onsite card ticketing machine (roadside by the Sheffield platform) or on the train (promise to pay available). The main building that used to be located here has been demolished, though there are brick waiting shelters still standing on both platforms. Train running information is offered via timetable posters, a help point on platform 1 and CIS screens. Step-free access is available to both platforms via the level crossing at the eastern end.

== Service ==
All services at Shireoaks are operated by Northern Trains.

The typical off-peak service in trains per hour is:

- 1 tph to Leeds via Sheffield
- 1 tph to Lincoln via Retford

On Sundays, the station is served by an hourly service between Lincoln and Sheffield, with some services continuing to Huddersfield.

Preceding station	National Rail	Following station
Kiveton Park	Northern Trains Sheffield to Lincoln Line	Worksop
	Historical railways	
Anston Line open, station closed	Great Central and Midland Joint Railway	Terminus
