= Great Central and Midland Joint Railway =

UK railway line

The Great Central and Midland Joint Railway, formerly, before 1897, Sheffield and Midland Railway Companies' Committee, was a collection of joint railways, mainly in the Manchester and South Yorkshire areas.

== Description of route ==
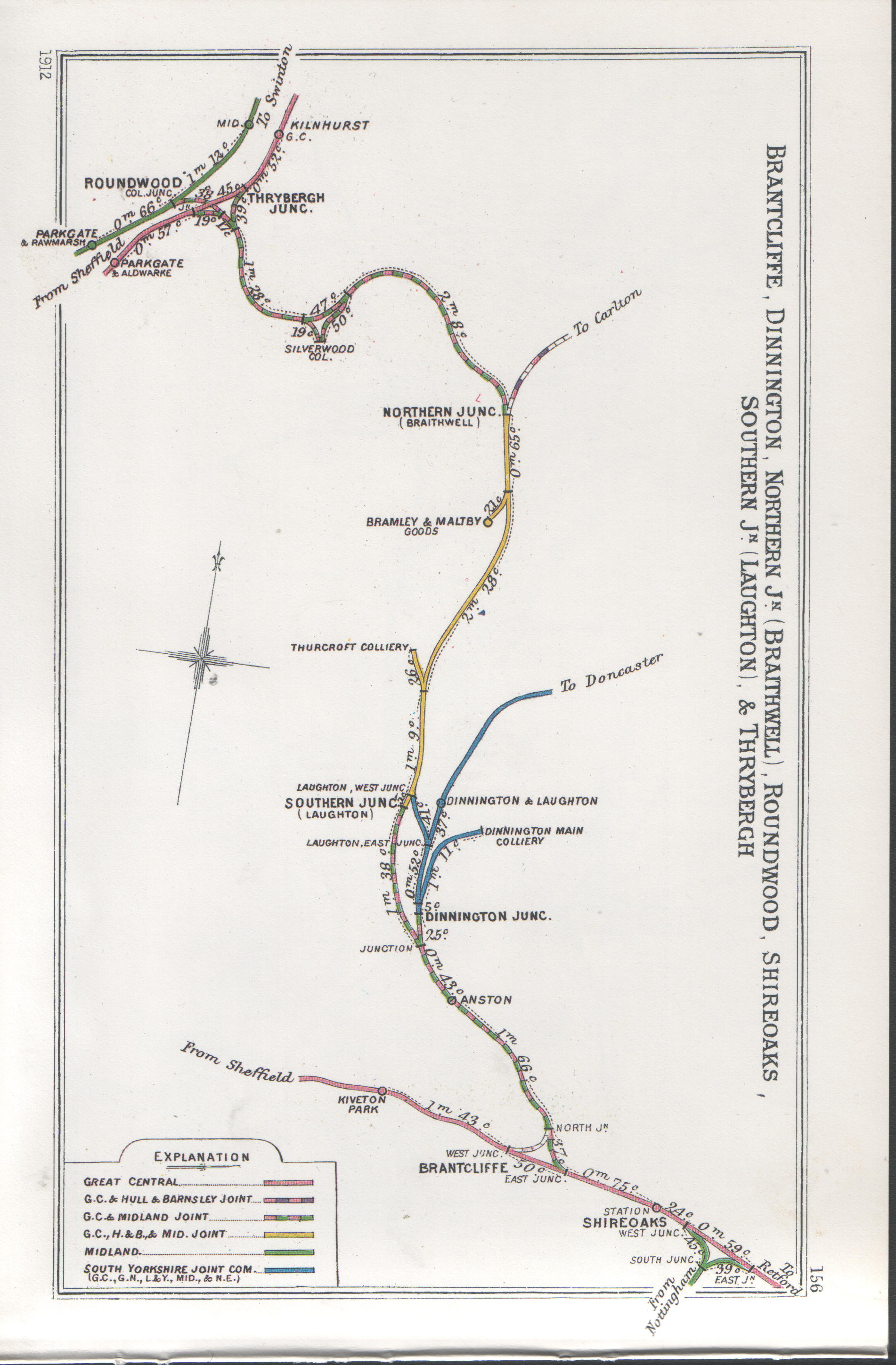
Railway Clearing House diagram showing the Great Central and Midland Joint Railway

In the South Yorkshire area most of the lines were colliery branches, where the companies joined forces to tap the coal measures and gain a foothold in the lucrative traffic. The main line within South Yorkshire was in two sections:

1. From Brantcliffe Junction, on the former Manchester, Sheffield and Lincolnshire Railway (MS&LR) Sheffield to Retford line northwards to an end-on junction with the Great Central, Hull and Barnsley and Midland Joint Railway Committee at Braithwell Junction, north of Dinnington Colliery.
2. Leaving the GC, H&B and MR Joint at Braithwell a line to both the Midland and former MS&LR lines in the Kilnhurst and Parkgate (Roundwood) area, much of this originally being built by the colliery company and being known locally, from 1910, as John Brown's Private Railway, linking their Silverwood Colliery to the staithes on the River Don and to Roundwood Colliery. This was incorporated into the Rotherham, Maltby and Laughton Railway, which became a constituent of the GC&M Joint.

Also included in the joint committee were short curves linking the partners lines.

In Manchester, most of these lines were on the eastern side of the city:

1. From Ashburys Junction, on the Woodhead Line, to New Mills where a branch line took the Great Central to Hayfield whilst the main section went to New Mills South Junction and joined the Midland line to Derby or Sheffield, via Chinley.
2. From the Woodhead line at Hyde Junction to Romiley Junction, an alternative line (and diversion) from above.

At grouping these lines became joint LNER/LMSR property.
