= Hull and Barnsley and Great Central Joint Railway =

UK railway line

The Hull and Barnsley and Great Central Joint Railway (also known as the Gowdall and Braithwell Railway) was a joint line which ran from Aire Junction, on the main line of the Hull and Barnsley Railway, near Gowdall to the Great Central and Midland Joint Railway at Braithwell Junction.

== Description ==
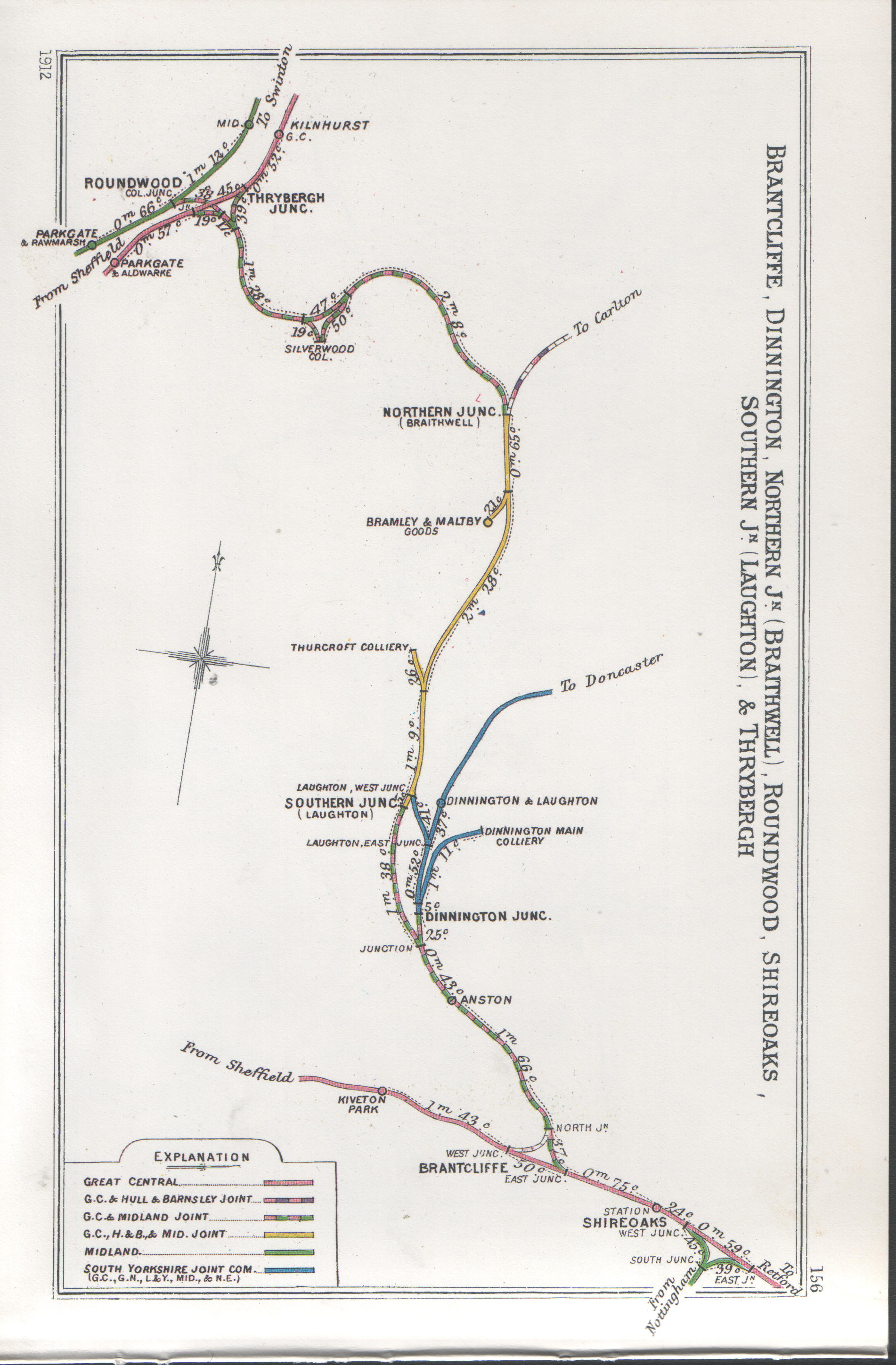
Railway Clearing House diagram showing the Great Central, Hull & Barnsley, and Midland joint line (yellow)

The railway consisted of a double track main line (21.4 miles (34.4 km) in length) which branched from the Hull and Barnsley railway at Aire junction near Gowdall.

The line crossed the Knottingley and Goole Canal (part of the Aire and Calder Navigation) via a rolling bascule lifting bridge. (Note: The bridge was never operable – it could be made working if the Canal began to carry ships) The River Don was also crossed by a 122 ft (37 m) girder truss bridge with 106 ft (32 m) approach spans on either side.

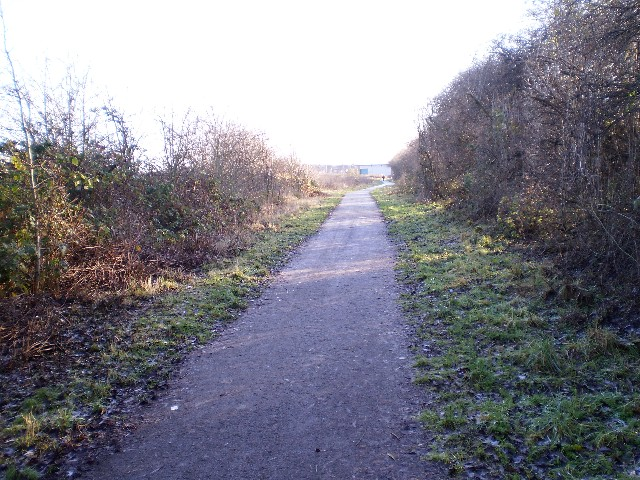
Path along the former line to Doncaster (York Road)

In addition to the main length of the line there were five branches:

- From Bullcroft junction at 9 miles (14 km) south of Aire junction.
  - To Bullcroft Colliery, 1 7/8 miles (3.0 km)
  - Bentley New Colliery, 5/8 mile (1.0 km)
- To Doncaster (York Road) railway station, 1 mile (1.6 km)
- To Sprotborough Junctions with GC (Doncaster Avoiding Line), 1/4 mile (0.4 km)
- To Yorkshire Main Colliery, 5/8 mile (1.0 km)

The line had five passenger stations although never a passenger service. The stations were situated on the edge or between the villages in their titles, even Doncaster (York Road) was well north of the town, beyond the Avoiding Line.

=== Laughton to Ravenfield joint line ===
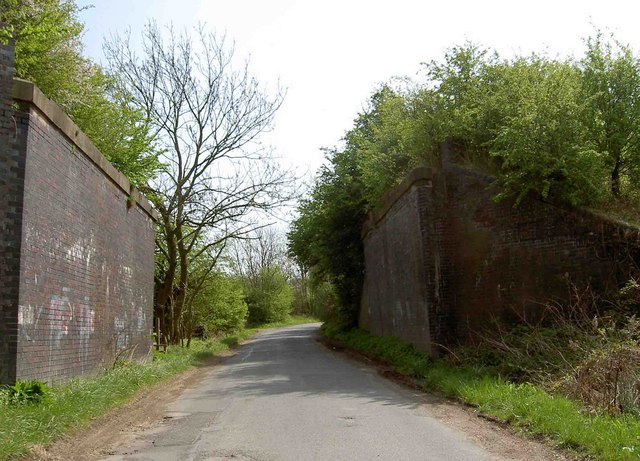
Remains of a bridge of the line between Laughton Junction and Ravenfield near Thurcroft

At the time of the construction of the South Yorkshire Joint Railway a joint line of the Great Central Railway, the Midland Railway and the Hull and Barnsley Railway was authorised by the Midland Railway Act 1907 (7 Edw. 7. c. cxxx) to operated by the Great Central, Hull and Barnsley and Midland Committee.

This 4-mile (6.4 km) line ran from Laughton (where it connected to the end of the Shireoaks, Laughton and Maltby Railway) to Ravenfield where it connected at Laughton West junction to the Great Central and Midland Railway's joint branch serving Silverwood Colliery. It connected to the Hull and Barnsley and Great Central Joint at Braithwell junction and opened in 1909.

Great Central, Hull & Barnsley and Midland Joint Railway

== History ==
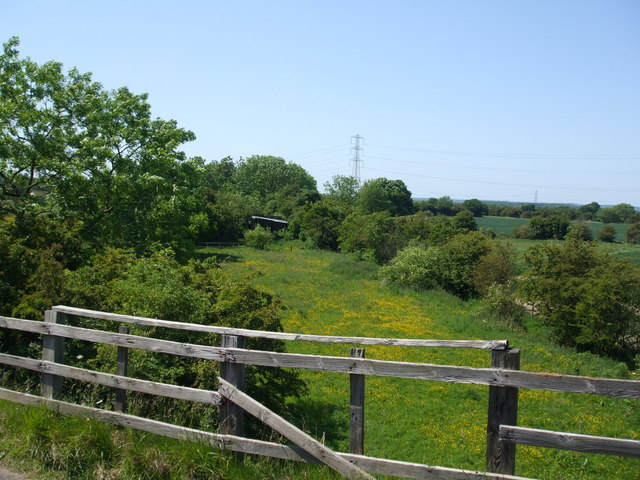
Former trackbed of the Hull and Barnsley and Great Central Joint Railway north of Thorpe in Balne

The line originally was to be worked by the Hull and Barnsley Railway and the Midland Railway; later in the planning stage the North Eastern Railway was offered running powers which resulted in the opposition of the Great Central. Eventually an act of parliament was passed in 1909 with the line as a joint H&BR and GC operation. The line opened on 1 May 1916.

The first closure came in 1939 with the south curve at York Road but the first main line closure, that from Bullcroft Junction to Aire Junction, took place in October 1958, however about one mile of this track was reopened in December 1961 and extended to Thorpe Marsh Power Station. This arrangement lasted until September 1970 when a new connection was put in from the WR&GR. Also in September 1970 the lines from Bullcroft Colliery to Skellow and Bullcroft Junction to Doncaster Junction closed. Warmsworth to Sprotborough closed in February 1969 and Warmsworth to Braithwell in March 1969 although this line had not seen through traffic for over 20 years.

In later years the line was used for wagon storage. First in the Second World War the southern section was used for the storage of 'cripples' – wagons repairable but with no time and no facilities to do the work in the war. It continued after the war with the line south of Warmsworth Junction being unavailable for traffic.

The development of the coalfield north of Doncaster did not, at that time, materialise and traffic was always 'light'. It was not until the line had been closed that the Selby Coalfield came on stream.
