= 1846 in the United Kingdom =

Events from the year 1846 in the United Kingdom. This year is noted for the repeal of the Corn Laws.

== Incumbents ==
- Monarch – Victoria
- Prime Minister – Robert Peel (Conservative) (until 29 June), Lord John Russell (Whig) (starting 30 June)
- Foreign Secretary – George Hamilton-Gordon, 4th Earl of Aberdeen (until 6 July) Henry John Temple, 3rd Viscount Palmerston (starting 6 July)
- Home Secretary – Sir James Graham (until 30 June) Sir George Grey (from 8 July)

== Events ==
- 5 January – The United States House of Representatives votes to stop sharing the Oregon Territory with the United Kingdom.
- 10 February – First Anglo-Sikh War: British victory at the Battle of Sobraon.
- 9 March – The conclusion of the First Anglo-Sikh War with the signing of the Treaty of Lahore. Kashmir is ceded to the British East India Company and the Koh-i-Noor diamond is surrendered to Queen Victoria.
- 13 March – Ballinglass Incident: eviction of 300 tenants at the village of Ballinglass in Ireland during the Great Famine.
- 14 March – First property purchased for Feargus O'Connor's Chartist-backed English National Land Company to provide smallholdings and suffrage for working men, at Heronsgate (O'Connorville) in Hertfordshire.
- 3 April – Last London-based mail coach runs to Norwich.
- 20 April – Jonathan Balls commits suicide in the Norfolk village of Happisburgh, aged around 76. Subsequent investigations suggest that he murdered at least 22 people, almost all family members, by arsenic poisoning over 20 years, making him one of Britain's most prolific serial killers.
- 15 May – Under the leadership of Prime Minister Robert Peel, the House of Commons votes to repeal the Corn Laws by passing an Importation Bill, replacing the old colonial mercantile trade system with free trade. On 25 June the Duke of Wellington persuades the House of Lords to pass the Act, which will take full effect from February 1849.
- 15 June – Treaty of Washington establishes the 49th Parallel as the border between Oregon and British Canada.
- 22 June – The North British Railway is opened to public traffic between Edinburgh and Berwick-upon-Tweed, the first line to cross the border between Scotland and England. Waverley Station is opened.
- 26 June – The Great Northern Railway is authorised by Act of Parliament with powers to construct a direct line from London to York (with a loop via Boston), 233.5 mi (375.8 km) with a capital of £5,600,000, the largest single railway scheme ever approved by Parliament.
- 29 June – Peel resigns, and is succeeded as prime minister by Lord John Russell (Whig). The Conservatives split into Peelite and Young England factions, the latter led by Disraeli.
- 9 July – A flood at East Wheal Rose lead mine in Cornwall kills 39.
- 16 July – The London and North Western Railway is formed in England by amalgamation of the London and Birmingham Railway, Grand Junction Railway and Manchester and Birmingham Railway.
- 30 July – Opening of Albert Dock, Liverpool.
- 1 August – Fatal Accidents Act 1846 ("Lord Campbell's Act") provides for a wrongful death claim in civil law.
- 8 August – The planet Neptune is first observed but not recognised by James Challis, director of the Cambridge Observatory.
- 15 August – Inauguration of Scott Monument in Edinburgh.
- 18 August – Parliament of the United Kingdom passes the following Acts
  - Religious Opinions Relief Act, removing most remaining disabilities affecting the ability of Jews, Dissenters and Roman Catholics to participate in public life.
  - Deodands Act, abolishing the ancient legal remedy of deodand, with effect from 1 September.
  - Gauge Act, ruling that new railways in Great Britain should be built to standard gauge (5 ft 3 inches in Ireland) unless otherwise authorised.
- 22 August – Peel Park, Salford, and Queen's Park and Philips Park in Manchester open as two of the world's first free public parks.
- 26 August
  - The Public Baths and Wash Houses Act (An Act to encourage the Establishment of public Baths and Wash-houses) is passed by Parliament permitting local authorities to establish baths and wash houses in Britain.
  - Felix Mendelssohn's oratorio Elijah first performed at the Birmingham Festival.
- 28 August
  - The New Zealand Constitution Act 1846 (An Act to make further Provision for the Government of the New Zealand Islands) is passed by Parliament with the intention of granting self-government to the British colony. Governor George Grey suspends implementation of the majority of the Act and it is superseded by the New Zealand Constitution Act 1852.
  - Railway Mania reaches its zenith, with 272 railway construction Acts being passed in this year.
- 3 September – Electric Telegraph Company founded.
- 10 October – William Lassell discovers Triton, one of the moons of Neptune.
- 21 December – Surgeon Robert Liston carries out the first operation under anaesthesia in Britain.

=== Undated ===
- Great Famine (Ireland) – the first deaths from hunger take place early in the year. Phytophthora infestans almost totally destroys the summer potato crop and the Famine worsens considerably. By December a third of a million destitute people are employed on public works.
- Start of Highland Potato Famine in Scotland.
- African American abolitionist Frederick Douglass continues his speaking tour of the UK throughout the year.
- Agapemone, a Christian sect and community, is founded by Rev. Henry Prince at Spaxton, Somerset.

== Publications ==
- The Brontë sisters' collection Poems by Currer, Ellis, and Acton Bell, their first published work (c. 22 May).
- Charles Dickens' novel Dombey and Son (serialisation begins 1 October) and novella The Battle of Life (c. December).
- Edward Lear's A Book of Nonsense (10 February).
- The String of Pearls: a Romance, probably written by James Malcolm Rymer and Thomas Peckett Prest, begins serialisation, the first literary appearance of Sweeney Todd (21 November).

== Births ==
- 9 February – Whitaker Wright, fraudulent financier (died 1904) (suicide)
- 18 February – Wilson Barrett, actor (died 1904)
- 6 March – Henry Radcliffe Crocker, dermatologist (died 1909)
- 17 March – Kate Greenaway, children's book illustrator and writer (died 1901)
- 3 May – Sir Edmund Elton, 8th Baronet, inventor, studio potter (died 1920)
- 25 May – Princess Helena of the United Kingdom (died 1923)
- 27 June – Charles Stewart Parnell, Irish political leader (died 1891)
- 2 August – Lucy Clifford (née Lane), novelist, dramatist and screenwriter (died 1929)
- 16 September – Anna Kingsford, physician, advocate of women's rights, anti-vivisection and vegetarianism (died 1888)
- 13 November – Herbert Standing, actor (died 1923)
- Undated
  - Pugsey Hurley, burglar, river pirate and underworld figure in New York City
  - Jeanne Schmahl, feminist in France (died 1915)

== Deaths ==
- 30 January – Joseph Constantine Carpue, surgeon (born 1764)
- 9 February – Henry Gally Knight, writer and traveler (born 1786)
- 10 March – Harriette Wilson, courtesan and memoirist (born 1786)
- 16 April – Domenico Dragonetti, double-bass virtuoso (born 1763 in Venice)
- 12 May – Sir Robert Otway, admiral (born 1770)
- 22 June – Benjamin Haydon, painter and writer (born 1786; suicide)
- 6 July – Sir Nicholas Conyngham Tindal, lawyer and politician (born 1776)
- 12 July – Charlotte Elizabeth Tonna, novelist (born 1790)
- 6 August – John Bostock, physician and geologist (born 1773; cholera)
- 5 September – Charles Metcalfe, 1st Baron Metcalfe, colonial administrator (born 1785)
- 23 September – John Ainsworth Horrocks, English-born explorer of South Australia (born 1818; accidentally shot)
- 26 September – Thomas Clarkson, abolitionist (born 1760)
- 12 December – Eliza Flower, musician and composer (born 1803; consumption)
