= Franklin v South Eastern Railway =

English tort law case

Franklin v. South Eastern Railway
- Citations: 3 H&N 211; 157 ER 448

Court membership
- Judge sitting: Baron Pollock

Franklin v South Eastern Railway (1858) 3 H&N 211; 157 ER 448 is an English tort law case relating to the measure of damages that can be gained for the death of a close relative under the Fatal Accidents Act 1846, as of 2024 governed instead by the Fatal Accidents Act 1976.

== Facts ==
A father was paid 3s. 6d. per week to carry coals to hospital wards where he was employed. But in fact he was not himself capable of carrying the coals and his son carried them for him. The son was killed. If the son had taken the 3s. 6d. a week and handed it over to the father for his upkeep, that contribution would unquestionably have been within the Act; the value of the services rendered is equally within the Act. The son was, by reason of the relationship, rendering services free to his father.

== Judgment ==
Baron Pollock held that there must be a "reasonable expectation of pecuniary benefit" which is to be claimed and recovered. It was not the loss of the son itself that was being recovered.

== See also ==
- English tort law
