= Read v Great Eastern Railway =

English tort law case

- Court: High Court of Justice (Queen's Bench Division)
- Full case name: Read v The Great Eastern Railway Company
- Decided: 25 June 1868
- Citations: (1868) LR 3 QB 555; [1867–68] LR 3 QB 555; [1868] UK Law Rp KQB 83; QBD 25 Jun 1868
- Cases cited: Blake v. Midland Railway Company (1852), 18 Q. B. 93
- Legislation cited: Fatal Accidents Act 1846 1 2

Court membership
- Judges sitting: Blackburn J Lush J

Keywords
- Actio personalis moritur cum persona; Damages; Double recovery; Loss of dependency; Personal injury; Plea of satisfaction

Read v Great Eastern Railway (1868) LR 3 QB 555 was an English tort law case which created a strong authority enshrining the principle that if a deceased person has settled a damages claim discharging all the claims and causes of action against the defendant in full satisfaction within their lifetime, no further action can be brought by their representatives if the injured person subsequently dies from the same injuries. It was held that a claim for loss of dependency under section 1 of the Fatal Accidents Act 1846, also known as "Lord Campbell's Act", could not be brought if a person died from the effects of an injury for which they had settled a claim during their lifetime, as they would not be capable of any fresh cause of action.

== Facts ==
The plaintiff was the wife of D. Read, a railway passenger, who was wounded as a result of negligence by the defendant, the Great Eastern Railway Company. During his lifetime, he brought an action for damages where he accepted a sum in full and final settlement of the injuries caused by the defendant's negligence. He subsequently died of the same injuries. As executrix of D. Read, his widow then brought an action for loss of dependency under Section 1 of the Fatal Accidents Act 1846.

== Judgment ==
Her claim for loss of support was dismissed. The injured party would not have been able to maintain an action, irrespective of his subsequent death, because he had already received full satisfaction of his claim during his lifetime, so no new right of action was capable of arising.

According to Blackburn J, before the Fatal Accidents Act 1846, a person who suffered a personal injury but survived its consequences would be permitted to bring an action to recover damages for that injury. However, if they then died from the effects of the same injuries, no action could be brought. Blackburn J went on to explain that the statute (the FAA 1846) was passed "to meet this state of the law".

=== Double recovery ===
I think the whole structure of the first section shows that the object of the Legislature was not to make the wrongdoer pay twice over, or to give the executor of the deceased person a new cause of action, but merely to give the executor a right to sue for the benefit of the family of the deceased where the axiom actio personalis moritur cum persona formerly prevented his doing so. It points only to cases where the person injured has not already obtained satisfaction, and although it gives a different measure of damages when the action is brought by the representative of the deceased, that does not affect the question of the right to bring a fresh action where the deceased person has in his lifetime received compensation for the injuries which he has sustained.

— Mr. Justice Lush, Read v. Great Eastern Railway Company (1868), L. R. 3 Q. B. 555

The damages awarded to the injured party during their lifetime would "debar further recovery" if a new action by the executor was attempted. Lush J clarified that the intention behind the new statute was not to charge the wrongdoer twice. The compromised settlement accepted by D. Read had the effect of precluding him, even if death had not ensued, from further recovery, which in turn meant that his widow, under the provision of the statute (FAA 1846), "could have no better right".

== Significance ==
In Reader & Ors v Molesworths Bright Clegg Solicitors [2017] EWCA Civ 169, Read v Great Eastern Railway Company was described as the "oldest authority". In Thompson & Ors v Arnold [2007] EWHC 1875 (QB), Langstaff J made the point in citing Read v Great Eastern Railway (1868) that the case law had been established for well over a hundred years and that he would have expected any reasonably proficient personal injury practitioner to be aware of the well-known authority which had been followed and recognised "at appellate level" ever since.

Although this authority has never been decided in the House of Lords, the principle has been accepted as the right one in a number of subsequent cases. It was expressed by their Lordships in Pickett v British Rail Engineering Ltd [1980] AC 136 that any sum accepted by the plaintiff in full settlement has the effect of precluding their dependents from making a claim for loss of dependency under the Fatal Accidents Act.

== See also ==
- Thompson v Arnold (2007) – Legal case concerning damages already awarded where death ensued
