= The Railway Age =

The Railway Age may refer to:

- Crewe Heritage Centre, in England, formerly known as The Railway Age
- Railway Age, a North American railroad magazine
- History of rail transport in Great Britain 1830–1922
