= Van Wees v Karkour =

Personal injury case with significance for the assessment of damages

Van Wees v Karkour & Anor
- Court: High Court of Justice
- Decided: 14 February 2007
- Citation: [2007] EWHC 165 (QB)
- Transcript: transcript at BAILII
- Cases cited: Bonnington Castiongs v. Wardlaw [1956] AC 613; McGhee v National Coal Board [1973] 1 WLR 1; Thompson v Smiths Shiprepairers (North Shields) Limited [1984] Q.B. 405; Holtby v Brigham & Cowan (Hull) Ltd. [2000] ICR 1086, CA); Blamire v Cumbria Health Authority [1993] PIQR Q1; Chase International Express Ltd v McRae [2003] EWCA Civ 505; Langford v Hebran [2001] EWCA Civ 361; Hannon v Pearce
- Legislation cited: Equal Pay Act 1970, section 1

Court membership
- Judge sitting: Mr Justice Langstaff

Keywords
- Damages; Future loss of earnings; Personal injury; Post-traumatic amnesia; Road traffic accident (RTA); Subtle brain injury

Van Wees v Karkour (1) and Walsh (2) [2007] EWHC 165 (QB) was an English law case of importance because of its implications in the assessment of damages. As such, it has relevance in particular to personal injury solicitors and employment consultants.

== Facts ==
Van Wees suffered a head injury and post-traumatic amnesia (PTA) in a road traffic accident whilst riding as a pillion passenger on a motorscooter. She claimed that the "loss of edge" caused by the accident had been a contributory factor which then led to dismissal from her employment. Her schedule of loss claimed for just under £10 million.

== Judgment ==
The Hon. Mr Justice Brian Langstaff awarded £1,105,012, saying that had she not been injured, she had a greater prospect of being retained in her employment. His judgment involved the assessment of the subtle effects of mild brain injury on someone who remained of superior intelligence and capable of achieving high earnings even after her accident. He determined that the injury had caused a "loss of edge" and that the claimant would have been capable of even higher earnings but for the accident. The court also found that the injury had been a contributory factor in the claimant losing the high level corporate job that she had started following her injury.

The key diagnostic indicator in subtle brain injury cases is post-traumatic amnesia. In the summary, the judge carefully defined PTA. The crucial point is that it is not a total lack of memory. Rather, it is characterized by "islands of memory, punctuating periods of loss of memory". It begins at the accident and lasts until the return of normal complete memory.

He also ruled that, whilst not accepting that she was consciously exaggerating her condition, he found that the accident had become "a handy explanation to herself as to the reason for the inability of her career to progress as she had expected it would". This case therefore also illustrates that a thorough investigation of a claimant's perceived medical condition as well as his or her own personal expectations can make a substantial difference to awards at trial.

The judge also had to make a decision based on the sex of the claimant. The defence had argued that since women earn less than men, including the upper echelons of management in the private sector, this should be reflected in the award.

The claimant suggested that this meant that a woman will throughout her foreseeable years of employment be at a similar disadvantage to that to which she is now subject, and has been since and despite the Equal Pay Act 1970 which came into force on 29 December 1975. In effect, the court was being asked to base an award for future loss of earnings upon an assumption that discrimination will continue, and that legislation counteracting discrimination in pay will be flouted. The court would thus be complicit in discrimination and the perpetuation of inequality. Justice Brian Langstaff ruled as follows:

...the court must be entitled to take note of the fact that throughout the professions greater numbers of women are achieving high positions, and with them commensurate salaries; that equal pay claims have been prominent in the recent past, particularly in the professions and amongst high earners in the city; and that the future is one in which the gap is narrowing. It must take account of the fact that in those positions in which men and women are doing equal work, a woman may not be paid a lesser salary without her having a claim for the shortfall against her employer (the contract of every woman includes a term to that effect, inserted by the Equal Pay Act 1970, section 1). Accordingly, I think it right to reflect in the sum which I shall award the fact that the claimant has (at present) the lower salary expectations of a woman, but within a few years should earn commensurately with a man. To take any other approach would be to enshrine current differences in pay which are gender based, rather than recognise their continuing and gradual attrition.

== See also ==
- English tort law
- Thompson v Arnold – Legal case concerning damages already awarded where death ensued
