= Wrongful death =

Wrong that causes another's death

Wrongful death is a type of legal claim or cause of action against a person who can be held liable for a death. The claim is brought in a civil action, usually by close relatives, as authorized by statute. In wrongful death cases, survivors are compensated for the harm and losses they have suffered after losing a loved one.

== Types of wrongful death claims ==
Any fatality caused by the wrongful acts of another may result in a wrongful death claim. Wrongful death claims are often based upon death resulting from negligence, for example following a motor vehicle accident caused by another driver, a dangerous roadway or defective vehicle, product liability, and medical malpractice. Dangerous roadway claims result from deaths caused in whole or in part by the condition of the roadway.

== Common law jurisdictions ==
In most common law jurisdictions, there was no common law right to recover civil damages for the wrongful death of a person. Under common law, a dead person cannot bring a suit (under the maxim actio personalis moritur cum persona), and this created an anomaly in which activities that resulted in a person's injury would result in civil sanction, but activities that resulted in a person's death would not. Some jurisdictions recognized a common law right of recovery for wrongful death, reasoning that "there is no present public policy against allowing recovery for wrongful death." In other jurisdictions the cause of action did not exist until the passage of a wrongful death statute.

Jurisdictions that recognize the common law right to recovery for wrongful death have used the right to fill in gaps in statutes or to apply common law principles to decisions. Many jurisdictions enacted statutes to create a right to such recovery. The issue of liability will be determined by the tort law of a given state or nation.

It may be possible for a family to seek retribution against someone who kills or is accused of killing a family member through tort rather than a criminal prosecution, which has a higher burden of proof. However, the two actions are not mutually exclusive; a person may be prosecuted criminally for causing a person's death (whether in the form of murder, manslaughter, criminally negligent homicide, or some other theory) and that person can also be sued civilly in a wrongful death action (as in the O.J. Simpson murder case).

=== Australia ===
In Australia, the standard of proof in a wrongful death action is 'on the balance of probabilities'. The statute of limitations to file a claim in Australia is three years from date of the death or the date upon which the cause of action arose.

To an extent, people can protect themselves from wrongful death lawsuits by having the participants sign a waiver.

=== United States ===
"Wrongful death" is a cause of action, or type of claim, that can be brought when one person or entity wrongfully causes someone's death. It allows a lawsuit to be filed even though the person who was harmed is no longer alive to bring the case. Each state has its own wrongful death statute and, although the details of the statutes vary significantly from state to state, the roots of most can be traced back to Lord Campbell's Act, passed by the United Kingdom's Parliament in 1846. In some states, the family of the decedent must bring two different types of claims: a "wrongful death" claim to recover the "full value of the life" of the deceased, and a survival claim on behalf of the decedent's estate to recover for funeral expenses, pain and suffering, or punitive damages.

The standard of proof in the United States is typically preponderance of the evidence as opposed to clear and convincing or beyond a reasonable doubt.

Each state has different laws regarding wrongful death claims. In most states, the statute of limitations (time limit to file a case) varies according to how the death occurred. For example, in Oregon, many wrongful death claims are subject to a three-year statute of limitations and in North Carolina there is a two-year statute of limitation - although exceptions may apply that could potentially allow a later lawsuit.

One of the most difficult wrongful death issues — and a particularly poignant illustration of how wrongful death expands liability beyond what was available at common law — is whether a wrongful death claim can be founded upon intentional infliction of emotional distress that caused the decedent to commit suicide. The first jurisdiction to allow such a claim was California in 1960, followed by Mississippi, New Hampshire, and Wyoming.

=== United Kingdom ===
In the United Kingdom, liability for causing a wrongful death was initially codified into legislation by the Fatal Accidents Act 1846 (Lord Campbell's Act). This law abrogated the common law rule that tort actions were extinguished by the injured party's death. The burden of proof in a wrongful death action is 'on the balance of probabilities'. The Fatal Accidents Act 1976 replaced its predecessor and imposes a three-year statute of limitations.

== See also ==
- Weregild
