= Fatal Accidents Act 1846 =

Act of the Parliament of the United Kingdom

Fatal Accidents Act 1846 (Note: The citation of this act by this short title was authorised by section 1 of, and the first schedule to, the Short Titles Act 1896. Due to the repeal of those provisions it is now authorised by section 19(2) of the Interpretation Act 1978.)
- Act of Parliament
- Parliament of the United Kingdom
- Long title: An Act for compensating the Families of Persons killed by Accidents.
- Citation: 9 & 10 Vict. c. 93
- Introduced by: John Campbell, 1st Baron Campbell (Lords)
- Territorial extent: England and Wales; Ireland; (Note: Section 6.)

Dates
- Royal assent: 26 August 1846
- Commencement: 26 August 1846
- Repealed: England and Wales: 1 September 1976; Northern Ireland: 26 August 1977
Other legislation
Amended by	Fatal Accidents Act 1864; Statute Law Revision Act 1875; Law Reform (Limitation of Actions, etc.) Act 1954; Fatal Accidents Act 1959
Repealed by	England and Wales: Fatal Accidents Act 1976; Northern Ireland:
Relates to	Deodands Act 1846

Status: Repealed

Text of statute as originally enacted

The Fatal Accidents Act 1846 (9 & 10 Vict. c. 93), commonly known as Lord Campbell's Act, was an act of the Parliament of the United Kingdom, that, for the first time in England and Wales, allowed relatives of people killed by the wrongdoing of others to recover damages.

== Background ==
Under the common law of England and Wales, the death of a person causes solely emotional and pure economic loss to their relatives. In general, damages cannot be recovered for either type of damage, only for physical damage to the claimant or their property. This was the rule declared by the court in Baker v. Bolton (1808). Scottish law was different in that the court could grant a solatium in acknowledgment of the family's grief.

Thus, if a person was injured through a tort, the wrongdoer would be liable for causing injury. If the person were killed, there would be no liability. Perversely, the wrongdoer had a financial interest in killing, rather than injuring, a victim.

However, during the 1830s the rapid development of the railways led to increasing public hostility to the epidemic of railway deaths and the indifferent attitudes of the railway companies. As a result, inquest juries started to revive the ancient remedy of deodands as a way of penalizing the railways. The railway accident at Sonning Cutting (1841) was particularly notorious, as the jury initially assigned a deodand value of £1,000 to the train.

This alerted legislators, in particular Lord Campbell and the Select committee on Railway Labourers (1846). In the face of railway opposition, Campbell introduced a bill in 1845, along with a bill to abolish deodands. The latter proposal, which became law as the Deodands Act 1846, to some extent mitigated railway hostility.

== Provisions ==
The act came into effect in August 1846 and gave personal representatives the right to bring a legal action for damages where the deceased person had such a right at the time of their death. Compensation was restricted to the husband, parent, or child of the deceased and was for "such damages ... proportioned to the injury resulting from such death." The wording left the question of how damages were to be assessed. In Franklin v. South Eastern Railway (1858), Baron Pollock held that the Act did not grant a Scottish-style solatium but solely damages for economic loss.

== Subsequent developments ==
Section 1 of the act, from " and although " onwards, was repealed by section 10(2) of, and part III of schedule 3 to, the Criminal Law Act 1967, which came into force on 1 January 1968.

The whole act was repealed for England and Wales by section 6(2) of, and schedule 2 to, the Fatal Accidents Act 1976, which came into force on 1 September 1976. The 1976 act which governs fatal accident compensation and is based on similar principles. Limited compensation for a family's grief was finally granted by the Administration of Justice Act 1982, section 3.

The whole act was repealed for Northern Ireland by the Fatal Accidents (Northern Ireland) Order 1977 (SI 1977/1251), which came into force on 26 August 1977.

== International inspirations ==
Similar legislation has since been brought into force throughout the English-speaking world. For example, part 3 of the Wrongs Act 1958 of Victoria, Australia is often referred to as a Lord Campbell's Act.

== See also ==
- Fatal Accidents Act

== Bibliography ==
- Cornish, W.; Clarke, G. (1989). Law and Society in England 1750-1950. London: Sweet & Maxwell. ISBN 0-421-31150-9.
- Holdsworth, W. S. (1916). "The origin of the rule in Baker v. Bolton". Law Quarterly Review. 32: 431.
- Kostal, R. W. (1994). Law and English Railway Capitalism, 1825–1875. ISBN 0-19-825671-X.
- Lunney, M.; Oliphant, K. (2003). Tort Law: Text and Materials (2nd ed.). Oxford: Oxford University Press. pp. 851–868. ISBN 0-19-926055-9.
