= George Wheler =

George Wheler may refer to:

- Sir George Wheler (travel writer) (1651–1724), English clergyman and travel writer
- George Wheler (politician) (1836–1908), Canadian mill owner and political figure

== See also ==
- Wheler baronets
- George Wheeler (disambiguation)
