= Thomas Martin Wheeler =

British radical activist, journalist, and insurance society manager (1811–1862)

Thomas Martin Wheeler (23 November 1811 – 16 February 1862) was a British radical activist, journalist, and insurance society manager.

== Biography ==
Born in Walworth, near London, Thomas was the brother of George William Wheeler. Their father was a wheelwright, who later became a victualler. Thomas was educated in Walton-le-Dale and Stoke Newington, and proved a successful student, remaining there until he was fourteen. After a couple of unsuccessful apprenticeships, he found work as a gardener in Kensington, and became a supporter of Robert Owen. He then developed an interest in Chartism. He was elected as the secretary of the London Chartists in 1839, as the Kensington representative of the National Charter Association in 1840 and 1841, and in 1841 was also elected to the organisation's executive.

Wheeler was travelling by train with his wife on Christmas Eve in 1841, when the Sonning Cutting railway accident occurred. He and his wife were thrown some distance from the train and buried by earth and luggage. They survived, but suffered permanent injuries, and his wife miscarried.

In 1842, the leading members of the National Charter Association were imprisoned. Wheeler agreed to temporarily take over the post of general secretary, and also minded the shop belonging to the former general secretary, John Campbell. In addition, he worked as the London correspondent for the Northern Echo, a newspaper sympathetic to Chartism. As a result, he stood down as secretary of the London Chartists in 1843, instead taking over the national post on a permanent basis.

Wheeler became interested in Feargus O'Connor's land scheme, and in 1845 he became the first secretary of the Land Plan organisation. This took up an increasing amount of his time, and in 1846 he resigned as secretary of the National Charter Association. In 1846, he also became chief clerk of the new Land Bank, but the concentration of money under his control led to accusations of dishonesty. While an investigation found all money correctly accounted for, Wheeler found the situation stressful, and resigned from his positions in the movement. He remained involved in the Chartist movement, taking the lead in organising the huge demonstration on Kennington Common in 1848.

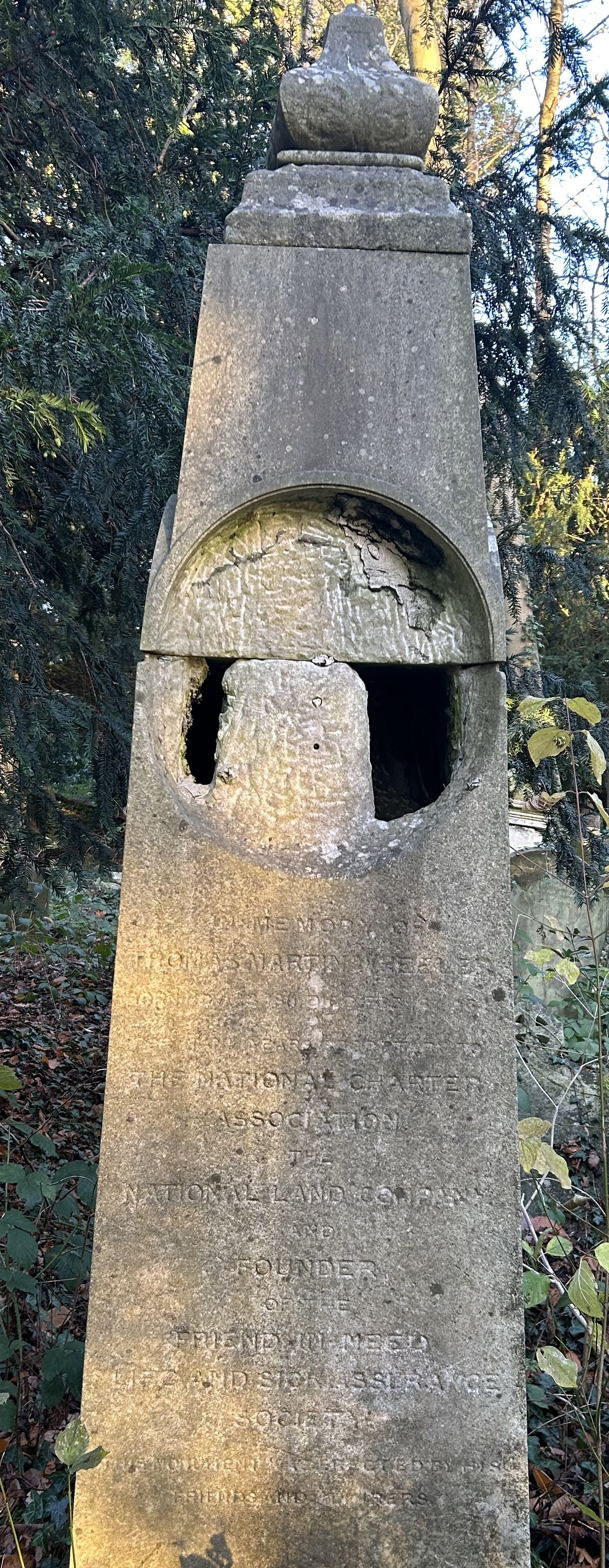
Grave of Thomas Martin Wheeler in Highgate Cemetery

With more time on his hands, Wheeler wrote a novel, Sunshine and Shadow, a semi-autobiographical work, which was serialised in the Northern Echo. He also advised the Amalgamated Society of Engineers during its first strike. He attended the Chartist convention of 1851 as a delegate for Exeter and Tiverton, despite having no connection with those places. The Land Company had found itself in financial difficulties, and Wheeler briefly returned as its secretary in an attempt to resolve them. He proposed reconstituting it as the National Loan Company, but this scheme did not find favour, and instead the company was wound up in 1852.

In 1852, Wheeler left the Northern Echo to become secretary of a new venture, the People's Paper, which was to be edited by Ernest Jones. However, its launch was marked by disputes, and Wheeler soon resigned, along with most of the executive committee. He was also briefly involved with the British Industry Association, the Labour League and Industrial and Provident Society, and as president of the National Political Union. For several years he was the secretary of the Friend-in-Need Life Assurance Society.

In 1858, Wheeler agreed to guarantee a loan for Ernest Jones, in order to keep the People's Paper afloat. Jones soon proved unable to repay the loan, but Wheeler was also unable to do so, and was placed in a debtor's prison until friends were able to pay it off.

Wheeler suffered a heart attack in the summer of 1861. While he appeared to recover, he had a second heart attack in February 1862, from which he died. He was buried on the western side of Highgate Cemetery.

Non-profit organization positions
Preceded by John Campbell	General Secretary of the National Charter Association; 1842–1846	Succeeded by ?
