= George William Wheeler =

British socialist activist

George William Wheeler (1815 – January 1878) was a British socialist activist, prominent in the First International.

Born in Walworth, near London, George was the brother of Thomas Martin Wheeler. Their father was a wheelwright, who later became a victualler.

Wheeler became a supporter of Robert Owen and active in the Chartist movement. With his brother, he helped run the Friend-in-Need Life Assurance Society, becoming secretary after his brother's death, in 1862.

In 1864, Wheeler attended the founding meeting of the International Workingmen's Association (IWMA). He was elected to the General Council of the IWMA, and was also the organisation's first treasurer. Although he left that post early in 1865, he was again the treasurer before the end of the year, serving until 1867. During the decade, he was also active in the Universal League for the Material Elevation of the Industrious Classes, and then served on the executive committee of the Reform League.

The Friend-in-Need collapsed in 1867, and Wheeler later moved to Glasgow, where he died early in 1878.
