= Deodands Act 1846 =

Act of the Parliament of the United Kingdom abolishing deodands

- Act of Parliament
- Parliament of the United Kingdom
- Long title: An Act to abolish Deodands.
- Citation: 9 & 10 Vict. c. 62
- Introduced by: John Campbell, 1st Baron Campbell (Lords)
- Territorial extent: United Kingdom

Dates
- Royal assent: 18 August 1846
- Commencement: 1 September 1846 (Note: Section 1.)
- Repealed: 11 August 1875
Other legislation
Repealed by	Statute Law Revision Act 1875
Relates to	Fatal Accidents Act 1846

Status: Repealed

Text of statute as originally enacted

The Deodands Act 1846 (9 & 10 Vict. c. 62) was an act of the Parliament of the United Kingdom, that abolished the ancient remedy of deodands.

== Background ==
By the early nineteenth century, the ancient remedy of deodands had largely fallen into desuetude. However, during the 1830s the rapid development of the railways led to increasing public hostility to the epidemic of railway deaths and the indifferent attitudes of the railway companies. Under the common law of England and Wales, the death of a person causes purely emotional and pure economic loss to their relatives. In general, damages cannot be recovered for either type of damage, only for physical damage to the claimant or their property, and families of fatal accident victims had no claim. This was the rule declared by the court in Baker v. Bolton (1808).

As a result, coroners' juries started to award deodands as a way of penalising the railways. The railway accident at Sonning Cutting (1841) was a particularly notorious example, in which deodands of £1,100 (equivalent to £92,000 in 2016) in total were made on the engine (Hecla), and the trucks. This alerted legislators, in particular Lord Campbell and the Select committee on Railway Labourers (1846). In the face of railway opposition, Campbell introduced a bill in 1845 that would lead to the Fatal Accidents Act 1846 (9 & 10 Vict. c. 93), Lord Campbell's Act, along with a bill to abolish deodands. The latter proposal, which became law as the Deodands Act 1846, to some extent mitigated railway hostility.

== Subsequent developments ==
The whole act was repealed by section 1 of, and the schedule to, the Statute Law Revision Act 1875 (38 & 39 Vict. c. 66), which came into force on 11 August 1875.

== Bibliography ==
- Cornish, W.; Clarke, G. (1989). Law and Society in England 1750–1950. London: Sweet & Maxwell. ISBN 0421311509.
- Kostal, R. W. (1994). Law and English Railway Capitalism, 1825–1875. ISBN 019825671X.
