= Fatal Accidents Act =

Stock short title for legislation

Fatal Accidents Act is a stock short title used in the United Kingdom for legislation relating to fatal accidents.

== List ==
Acts of the Parliament of the United Kingdom

The Fatal Accidents Act 1846 (9 & 10 Vict. c. 93), also known as Lord Campbell's Act
The Fatal Accidents Act 1864 (27 & 28 Vict. c. 95)
The Fatal Accidents Act 1959 (7 & 8 Eliz. 2. c. 65)
The Fatal Accidents Act 1976 (c. 30)

The Fatal Accidents Inquiry (Scotland) Act 1895 (58 & 59 Vict. c. 36)
The Fatal Accidents and Sudden Deaths Inquiry (Scotland) Act 1906 (6 Edw. 7. c. 35)
The Fatal Accidents and Sudden Deaths Inquiry (Scotland) Act 1976 (c. 14)

Northern Ireland Orders in Council

The following order is considered to be primary legislation:

The Fatal Accidents (Northern Ireland) Order 1977 (SI 1977/1251) (NI 18)

== See also ==
- List of short titles
