= George Wheeler =

George Wheeler may refer to:

- George Wheeler (explorer) (1842–1905), explorer and cartographer, leader of the Wheeler Survey
- George Wheeler (entomologist) (1858–1947), English entomologist
- George Wheeler (footballer) (1910–1995), Welsh footballer
- George Wheeler (gymnast) (1914-1990), American Olympic gymnast
- George Wheeler (pitcher) (1869–1946), baseball pitcher
- George F. Wheeler (1824–1903), American politician and banker in Wisconsin
- George Godfrey Massy Wheeler (1873–1915), recipient of the Victoria Cross
- George Wheeler (pinch hitter) (1881–1918), baseball player for 1910 Cincinnati Reds
- George Huber Wheeler (1881–1957), United States Navy sailor and Medal of Honor recipient
- George Campbell Wheeler (1880–1938), recipient of the Victoria Cross
- George W. Wheeler (1860–1932), lawyer, judge, and chief justice of the Supreme Court of Connecticut
- George William Wheeler (1815–1878), British socialist activist
- George C. Wheeler (1897–1991), entomologist
- George Augustus Wheeler (1837–1923), Maine historian
- George Shaw Wheeler (1908–1998), American economist
