= Thompson v Arnold =

Legal case concerning damages already awarded where death ensued

- Court: High Court of Justice
- Full case name: Thompson & Ors v Arnold
- Started: 5 June 2007
- Decided: 6 August 2007
- Citation: [2007] EWHC 1875 (QB)
- Cases cited: Read v Great Eastern Railway (1868) LR 3 QB 555); Riverlate Properties Limited v Paul [1975] Ch 133; Thomas Bates Limited v Wyndham's Limited (Lingerie) Limited [1981] 1 WLR 505; George Wimpey UK Ltd. V VI Construction Ltd. [2005] EWCA 77; Harris v Empress Motors [1984] 1 WLR 212; Gammell v Wilson [1982] AC 27; Pickett v British Rail Engineering Ltd. [1980] AC 136 (...)
- Legislation cited: Law Reform (Miscellaneous Provisions) Act 1934; Fatal Accidents Act 1976; Limitation Act 1980, Section 12; Administration of Justice Act 1982; Human Rights Act 1998, Section 3

Court membership
- Judge sitting: Mr Justice Langstaff

Keywords
- Abuse of process; Actio personalis moritur cum persona; Consequential losses; Damages; Dependants; Double recovery; Income dependency; Limitation; Personal injury; Right of action; Statutory construction

Thompson & Ors v Arnold [2007] EWHC 1875 (QB), was a law on damages case where the existing case law (Read v Great Eastern Railway (1868) LR 3 QB 555) reaffirmed that damages awarded for a claim for personal injury were deemed to have already been awarded, even if death ensued as a consequence of personal injury. Where a claimant had settled their damages claim, or pursued it to trial, their dependants would have no right of action under the Fatal Accidents Act 1976 if the injury later proved fatal. Langstaff J. held that Read v Great Eastern Railway had been correctly decided as a matter of statutory construction and neither Article 6 nor Article 8 of the ECHR had been infringed. The claim was dismissed.

== Facts ==
At the age of 31, Wendy Thompson consulted her GP, the defendant, Doctor Christine Arnold, about a lump on her left breast which was diagnosed by the defendant as benign, when it was not. By the time it became apparent that the diagnosis had been negligently made, it was too late to save Mrs Thompson's life. In all probability, she may not have died if the correct diagnosis had been made.

At the point she became aware that a cause of action was possible against her former doctor, she was already terminally ill, however, she managed to serve proceedings against her former doctor by September 1999. It was predicted that she would die of cancer at some point within the next year. Her lifetime action was settled for the sum of £120,000 in "full and final satisfaction of her claim", however, she had first obtained judgment in default of defence because liability was not in question at that stage.

It ought to have been well known by any reasonably proficient personal injury practitioner that case law (Read v Great Eastern Railway (1868) LR 3 QB 555) had established well over a hundred years before that where a claimant pursued to judgment or settlement a claim for damages for an injury which subsequently proved fatal their dependants could have no right of action under the Fatal Accidents Act 1976.

— The Hon. Mr Justice Langstaff, BAILII transcript

The schedule of loss and damage described in the particulars of claim of September 1999 contained a statement that after her death, her dependants would be able to issue a separate claim pursuant to the Fatal Accidents Act 1976. However, her legal representatives appeared to have been unaware that a Fatal Accidents Act claim could not be brought by dependants in the situation where the deceased had already been awarded damages.

Wendy Thompson died on 10 April 2002. Three years later her husband and two daughters issued a claim against Dr Arnold under the Fatal Accidents Act 1976. When the case came before the High Court on 7 April 2005, the defence sought direction on the preliminary issue that the action could not be brought since the damages claim of the deceased had been settled during her lifetime.

== Judgment ==
It was held that the dependants of an accident victim who had already received a compensation award for personal injury which later prove fatal were unable to make a claim under the Fatal Accidents Act 1976. More specifically, an action under the Fatal Accidents Act 1976 cannot be brought where there has been full and final settlement of a claim made under The Law Reform (Miscellaneous Provisions) Act 1934, also known as a LR(MP)A claim.

The alternative construction of the Fatal Accidents Act 1976, as argued by Counsel for Mrs Thompson’s family, would have been that the dependants would have been permitted a right of action for financial dependency (Note: Also referred to as "income dependency") on the injured person's death, even though the injured person might have already settled a claim for loss of earnings “during the lost years” and within the deceased's lifetime. Langstaff J stated that in effect, the fatality would be the circumstance which engaged the right of action under FAA 1976 in the first place and it followed that this would have given rise to the prospect of "impermissible double recovery" which would have been an abuse of process.

=== Interaction of statute ===
As part of the judgment, a contrasted approach was taken to the interaction of the two statutes: The Fatal Accidents Act 1976 and the Law Reform (Miscellaneous Provisions) Act 1934, as follows:

Under the Law Reform (Miscellaneous Provisions) Act 1934, a damages claim:

- would be made by the claimant themselves and any damages would be paid directly to them
- if made on a lump sum basis, would be a claim for loss of earnings up to the date of anticipated death
- would not be caught by the introduction of periodical payment orders
- would be a life time damages award for a claimant whose death is impending and thereafter could include a claim for the "lost years"
- would not contain any element of care for any child, or husband, of the claimant after death
- could, however, include the costs incurred in doing what the claimant would have done in order to care for family members up until they died
- would not necessarily arise from wrongful action that proved fatal
- where the claimant dies, any sum remaining from the award they received would be dealt with as part of their estate, and in accordance with their will, subject only to any claims under the Inheritance (Family Provision) legislation.

Under The Fatal Accidents Act 1976, a damages claim:

- would be one of "earnings dependency" and one of "services dependency"
- would contain no lump sum for pain, suffering and loss of amenity of the deceased
- would permit dependants to claim a bereavement lump sum award for a standard figure prescribed by legislation
- if made by dependants for their direct benefit, would not be subject to the laws of intestacy, or to any will

=== Mistake and duty ===
At an early stage, prior to pleadings being issued, a mistake of law had been made by the head of the solicitor and counsel for the claimant. The mistake was that the legal representatives appeared to be unaware that a claim under the Fatal Accidents Act could not be brought where the deceased had already been awarded, or had agreed, damages for their injury. This had the effect of the damages claim being erroneously and deliberately overvalued. The claim which had been settled for £120,000 did not include an amount for future loss of earnings, or rather, the “lost years”. The defendant's solicitor did not inform the claimant's legal advisors of the mistake because she believed, "consistent with her professional duty to her client", that she should not point out the mistake to the opponent.

When proceedings were brought, the mistake of law by the late Mrs Thompson’s solicitor and counsel was admitted candidly to the court. However, this mistake had been taken advantage of by the defendant in the original case. This amounted to a unilateral mistake, rather than mutual mistake.

The defendant took an advantage of a patent mistake of law by the deceased's solicitor and counsel, but this mistake was not instigated by the defendant,... ...if I had thought that the conduct of the defendant was unconscionable, I should have declined relief in any event, in the exercise of my discretion, because of the conduct of the deceased by her legal representatives.

— The Hon. Mr Justice Langstaff, BAILII transcript

Langstaff J. approved (Note: The duty that falls on solicitors of the opposing side, as set out in Thames Trains Ltd v Adams, was reinforced by Langstaff J. in Thompson v Arnold [2007] EWHC 1875 (QB)) the conclusion of Nelson J. in Thames Trains Limited and Railtrack PLC v Michael Adams [2006] EWHC 3291 that there is no general duty upon one party to litigation, or potential litigation, to point out the mistakes of another party or its legal advisers, and for the following reasons:

- there was no duty to advise the opposing legal representatives
- each party seeks their own advice in an adversarial system
- a solicitor’s duty was to his client, however, this is subject to their duty to the court
- if a "reasonable man" would ask in the situation where a solicitor enlightens the other party as to their mistake: "whose side are you on?"

However, this mistake was not contrived by Dr Arnold or her legal team, and the court accepted that this was not a situation where the conduct of Dr Arnold or her legal team was considered to be unconscionable. However, the facts of a case would be taken into account and any mistake instigated by the conduct of the defendant would have been given different consideration.

=== Limitation ===
Any action to recover damages in respect of the injury due to Dr Arnold's negligence was precluded from the point Wendy Thompson settled her claim. Section 12 of the Limitation Act 1980 was cited as providing for:

"(1) An action under the Fatal Accidents Act 1976 shall not be brought if the death occurred when the person injured could no longer maintain an action and recover damages in respect of the injury (whether because of a time limit in this Act or in any other Act, or for any other reason)
Where any such action by the injured person would have been barred by the time limit in Section 11 of this Act, no account shall be taken of the possibility of that time limit being over ridden under Section 33 of this Act."

The court found that both the Fatal Accidents Act and Section 12 of the Limitation Act provided that:

"a right of children and spouses to claim an award for loss of their dependency upon the deceased wife and mother arises where there has been no determination (by settlement or judgment) of the claim of the injured victim prior to her death."
