= Deodand =

Term in English law

In law, a deodand is an object or instrument forfeited because it has caused a person's death.

The English common law of deodands traces back to the 11th century and was applied, on and off, until Parliament abolished it in 1846. Under this law, a chattel (i.e. some personal property, such as a horse or a haystack) was considered a deodand whenever a coroner's jury decided that it had caused the death of a human being. In theory, deodands were forfeited to the Crown, which was supposed to sell the chattel and then apply the profits to some pious end.

The term deodand derives from the Latin phrase deo dandum, which means 'to be given to God'. In reality, the juries who decided that a particular animal or object was a deodand also appraised its value, and the owners were expected to pay a fine equal to the value of the deodand. If the owner could not pay the deodand, his township was held responsible.

== History ==
Before 1066, animals and objects causing serious damage or death were called banes and were handed over directly to the victim in a practice known as noxal surrender. In The Common Law, Oliver Wendell Holmes, Jr. writes that this practice, common to the Greeks and Romans, the Germanic tribes, and the Mosaic Law, was rooted in a primitive conception of guilt as inhering within the "guilty" object, so that "the ground of the owner's liability was his ownership of the offending thing and his failure to surrender it." Early English legislation also directed people to pay specific sums of money, called weregild, as compensation for actions that resulted in someone else's death; this was given to the family of the person killed.

Holmes writes:

As long ago as Bracton, in case a man was slain, the coroner was to value the object causing the death, and that was to be forfeited as deodand "pro rege." It was to be given to God, that is to say to the Church, for the king, to be expended for the good of his soul. A man's death had ceased to be the private affair of his friends as in the time of the barbarian folk-laws. The king, who furnished the court, now sued for the penalty. He supplanted the family in the claim on the guilty thing, and the Church supplanted him.

— Oliver Wendell Holmes, Jr., The Common Law

The transition from bane to deodand remains obscure. By the second half of the thirteenth century, however, the coroner's rolls were replete with references to vats, tubs, horses, carts, boats, stones, trees, etc. The rules on which they depended were not easily explained by the old commentators. The law distinguished, for instance, between a thing in motion and a thing standing still. If a horse or other animal in motion killed a person, whether infant or adult, or if a cart ran over him, it was forfeited as a deodand. On the other hand, if death were caused by falling from a cart or a horse at rest, the law made the chattel a deodand if the person killed were an adult, but not if he were below the years of discretion.

Deodands were still being forfeited throughout the 16th and 17th centuries, although not as frequently as before. Some scholars think the practice died out completely in the 18th century. Others speculated that deodands had become nominal assessments that were routinely levied. Another possibility is that the practice was receiving less official attention because the profits from deodands were no longer going into royal coffers. By then, the Crown had long sold off the rights to deodands from most jurisdictions to lords, townships and corporations.

== Demise ==
The rapid development of the railways during the 1830s saw an epidemic of railway deaths. The indifferent attitudes of the railway companies caused increasing public hostility.

Under the common law of England and Wales, compensation could only be paid for physical damage to the claimant or their property. The families of fatal accident victims had no claim for purely emotional and economic loss. As a result, coroner's juries started to award deodands as a way of penalising the railways.

On Christmas Eve 1841, in an accident on the Great Western Railway, a train ran into a landslip in Sonning Cutting and eight passengers were killed. The inquest jury assigned a deodand value of £1,000 to the train. Subsequently, a Board of Trade inspector exonerated the company from blame and the deodand was quashed on appeal, on technicalities.

This alerted legislators, in particular Lord Campbell and the Select committee on Railway Labourers (1846). In the face of railway opposition, Campbell introduced a bill in 1845 to compensate victims. The bill led to the Fatal Accidents Act 1846, also known as Lord Campbell's Act. Campbell also introduced a bill to abolish deodands. The latter proposal, which became law as the Deodands Act 1846, to some extent mitigated railway hostility.

== In the United States ==
In American law, the deodand has been cited as a source for the modern civil forfeiture doctrine.

The constitutions of New Hampshire and Vermont prohibit deodands, along with the Idaho Criminal Code and Rhode Island law.

== Bibliography ==
- Sutton, T. (1997). "The deodand and responsibility for death". Journal of Legal History. 18 (3): 44–55. doi:10.1080/01440369708531186.
