= Employment consultant =

An employment consultant is an expert witness who advises courts and tribunals on employment related issues such as earnings, labour market analysis, residual earning capacity, and retraining. The main area involved is that of personal injury litigation where loss of earnings is an important component of a claim. Employment consultants give evidence on pre and post accident earnings, thus establishing a loss of earnings formula. Employment consultants also deal with sex, race and disability discrimination, matrimonial matters and any case involving a loss or dispute of earnings. Increasingly, pay parity is a growth area.

Usually solicitors will use an employment report to quantify the loss of earnings or Smith v. Manchester awards.

An employment consultant, like other experts witnesses, may be instructed by the solicitors for the claimant, the defendant, or as a jointly instructed expert, and may be required to give evidence under oath at trials and tribunal hearings.

Although employment consultants provide reports for many jurisdictions worldwide, the core areas are the countries using the common law system. Because of its different trial and compensation system for personal injury, the United States is less important than might be expected, and the main jurisdictions for which these experts prepare reports are England and Wales, Scotland, Republic of Ireland and South Africa. Most employment experts are based in the UK.

This type of expertise was a growth area from the mid-1980s to the end of the 1990s, but was adversely affected by changes in the United Kingdom, the most important area. These included the withdrawal of legal aid for most personal injury cases, which meant that lawyers operating on a "no win no fee" basis were less likely to take up claims or incur the additional costs.

The Civil Procedure Rules 1998 also meant that the need for an expert report had to be sanctioned by a District Judge, which, together with the introduction of joint instruction also reduced demand.

In the decade since the CPR a number of practitioners have diversified into associated areas such as case management, rehabilitation, and, increasingly, pay parity cases, following the wave of such cases initiated in the mid-2000s by trade unions and the controversial solicitor, Stefan Cross.

A recent (2007) case of importance to employment consultants and personal injury solicitors is Van Wees v Karkour and Walsh. This dealt with the medical aspects of post-traumatic amnesia, but also clarified the financial impact of mild head injury even on those who remain capable of high level work. The judge in the case also made an important ruling that awards to women should not be based on their current lower earnings compared to men in the same occupation, since that would perpetuate inequality in the face of equal pay legislation.
