= Brian Langstaff =

British judge (born 1948)

The Honourable Sir Brian Langstaff

Justice of the High Court
- In office 3 October 2005 – 30 April 2018

President of the Employment Appeal Tribunal
- In office 1 January 2012 – 31 December 2015
- Preceded by: Mr Justice Underhill
- Succeeded by: Mrs Justice Simler

Personal details
- Born: Brian Frederick James Langstaff; 30 April 1948 (age 78)
- Spouse: Deborah Weatherup (m. 1975)
- Education: St Catharine's College, Cambridge

Sir Brian Frederick James Langstaff (born 30 April 1948) is a British judge. Called to the Bar at the Middle Temple, he served as a High Court judge from 2005 to 2018 as Mr Justice Langstaff, and was the president of the Employment Appeal Tribunal from 2012 to 2015.

From 2018 to 2024, Langstaff chaired the Infected Blood Inquiry, which investigated the causes and effects of the contaminated blood scandal in the United Kingdom from the 1970s to the 1990s. In his seven-volume final report, Langstaff found that the scandal could "largely, though not entirely, have been avoided", and that successive governments and the National Health Service covered up the risk to patients who received infected blood products.

== Early life and education ==
Langstaff was born on 30 April 1948 to Frederick and Muriel Langstaff (née Griffin). He was educated at George Heriot's School, Edinburgh, and then at St Catharine's College, Cambridge. Before his legal career, he worked in Sri Lanka with VSO in 1966 and 1967.

== Legal career ==
In 1971, Langstaff was called to the Bar of England and Wales at the Middle Temple, where he received the Harmsworth Scholarship in 1975. He became a bencher of the Middle Temple in 2001. Langstaff was appointed Queen's Counsel in 1994, and became a recorder for the South Eastern Circuit in 1995.

Langstaff was appointed a justice of the High Court on 3 October 2005 and assigned to the Queen's Bench Division. He became the president of the Employment Appeal Tribunal from 1 January 2012, succeeding Mr Justice Underhill, and was succeeded by Mrs Justice Simler on 1 January 2016.

Langstaff was appointed on 8 February 2018 to chair the Infected Blood Inquiry, which investigated the contaminated blood scandal in the United Kingdom during the 1970s to the 1990s. He retired from the High Court on 30 April 2018 to work full-time on the inquiry. In an interim report published in July 2022, Langstaff concluded that the 4,000 victims were provisionally entitled to £100,000 each and the payments ought to be made quickly.

=== Notable cases ===
- Thompson v Arnold (2007) Legal case concerning damages already awarded where death ensued
- Van Wees v Karkour (2007) Road traffic accident personal injury case with significance for the assessment of damages

== Personal life ==
Langstaff married Deborah Weatherup in 1975. They have a son and a daughter.
