= Solatium =

Legal term for compensation for emotional harm

Solatium (plural solatia) is a form of compensation for emotional rather than physical or financial harm. The word entered English during the 1810s, as a loanword from Latin sōlātium or sōlācium.

== World examples ==
=== India ===
In India, victims of crimes that receive widespread media coverage are frequently recipients of one-time solatium payments from governments.

=== South Africa ===
It is used in South African law as a delictual remedy for pain and suffering. To sue for solatium, a claimant must institute an action for pain and suffering or an actio iniuriarum.

=== United Kingdom ===
==== England and Wales ====
Section 1A of the Fatal Accidents Act 1976 provides that in an action for wrongful death the spouse, civil partner or parents (where the deceased is a minor) of the deceased may claim damages for bereavement, which are awarded in the amount of a fixed sum. This has been described as a soliatum.

==== Scots law ====
It is used in Scots law mainly to denote reparation for pain and suffering in personal injury cases (although it can also be awarded in other types of cases), but also has a more technical meaning as the form of reparation available in an actio iniuriarum. In the former respect it is similar, but not identical, to the English law concept of general damages; Scots law damages are divided into pecuniary and non-pecuniary losses, rather than general and special damages. In the latter sense, there is no ready English equivalent, as English law did not receive the legacy of the Roman actio iniuriarum.

=== United States ===
Beginning during the Vietnam War, and continuing in Iraq and Afghanistan, the US Department of Defense (DOD) provides monetary assistance in the form of solatia and condolence payments to Iraqi and Afghan nationals who are killed, injured, or incur property damage as a result of U.S. or coalition forces' actions during combat.
