= Ballinlass incident =

Mass eviction during the Great Famine in Ireland

The Ballinlass incident (Irish: Eachtra Bhaile an Leasa) was the eviction of 300 tenants on 13 March 1846 in Ireland, in the context of the Great Famine in Ireland (1845–1849). At this time, Ireland was part of the United Kingdom of Great Britain and Ireland, governed directly by its parliament in London. Most Irish peasant farmers were tenants under landlords, producing cereals, potatoes and livestock. But only the potatoes remained as food for the farmers themselves; the other products were used for paying the rent and exported from Ireland to Great Britain. These exports continued when the potato crop failed in 1845.

Farmers who failed to pay the rent in this situation were evicted from their homes and land. It is estimated that tens of thousands were evicted during the famine.

The 300 inhabitants of the townland of Ballinlass in Galway County, in the Barony of Killian, northeast of Mountbellew, were relatively "wealthy" and able to pay their rent. But despite this fact, they were evicted on 13 March 1846 because the landlord, a Mrs Gerrard, intended to establish a grazing farm where the village was situated.

The houses of Ballinlass were demolished by army and police; the people slept in the ruins in the following night. The next day, police and army returned to evict them definitively. Their neighbours were not allowed to take them in.

The eviction of the entire village received wide publicity and was 'personally investigated' by Lord Londonderry, who, in a statement to the House of Lords on March 30, 1846 said 'I am deeply grieved, but there is no doubt concerning the truth of the evictions at Ballinlass. Seventy six families, comprising 300 individuals had not only been turned out of their houses, but had even - the unfortunate wretches - been mercilessly driven from the ditches to which they had been taken themselves for shelter..these unfortunate people had their rents actually ready..' Despite widespread condemnation, the eviction order was not rescinded.
