= Charles Edward Pollock =

English judge, 1823–1897

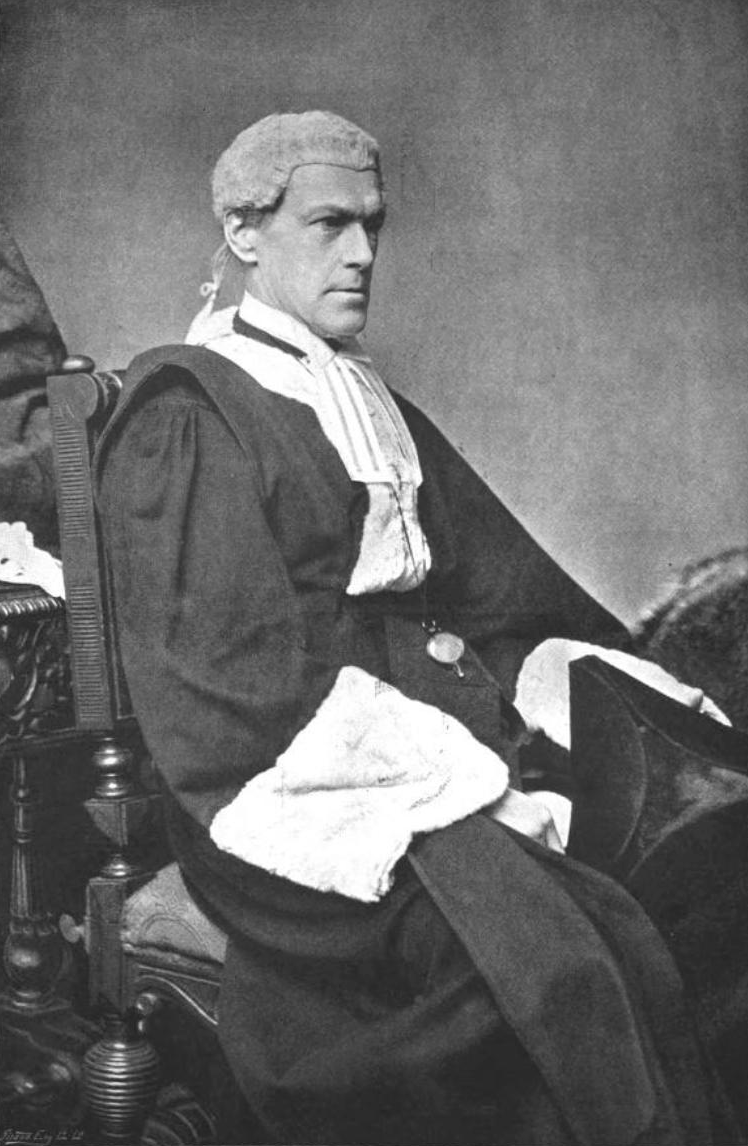
Baron Pollock

Sir Charles Edward Pollock (31 October 1823 – 21 November 1897) was an English judge, one of the last Barons of the Court of the Exchequer and serjeants-at-law.

== Life ==
Charles Edward Pollock was born on 31 October 1823, the fourth son of Sir Jonathan Frederick Pollock, by his first wife, Frances, daughter of Francis Rivers.

He was educated at St. Paul's School from 1833 to 1841, and, dispensing with a university course, served a long and varied apprenticeship to the law as private secretary and (from 1846) marshal to his father, and also as pupil to James Shaw Willes. On 18 January 1842, he was admitted student at the Inner Temple, where he was called to the bar on 29 January 1847, and elected bencher on 16 November 1866.

For some years after his call Pollock went the home circuit without success. Meanwhile, however, he made himself known as a reporter in the court of exchequer, then unusually efficient, cf. Sir Edward Hall Alderson, and Sir James Parke, Baron Wensleydale, and as a legal author. By these means, he gradually worked his way into practice, and after holding the complimentary offices of "tubman" and "postman" in the court of exchequer, took silk on 23 July 1866.

As a leader, he had for some years a large and lucrative practice, especially in mercantile cases, and on the retirement of Baron Channell in 1873 he was raised to the exchequer bench (10 January), invested with the coif (13 January), and knighted (5 February) The consolidation of the courts effected by the Judicature Acts gave him in 1875 the status of justice of the high court, but did not alter his official designation. It was, however, provided that no new barons of the exchequer should be created, and the death of Baron Huddleston (5 December 1890) left Pollock in exclusive possession of one of the most ancient and honourable of judicial titles. A similar historic distinction, that of representing the ancient and doomed order of serjeants-at-law, he shared with Lords Esher and Penzance, and Sir Nathaniel Lindley. On the dissolution of Serjeants' Inn in 1882 he was re-elected bencher of the Inner Temple. Pollock tried, in April 1876, the unprecedented case of the Queen v. Keyn, arising out of the sinking of the British vessel Strathclyde by the German steamship Franconia. The collision occurred within three miles of the English coast, and Keyn, the master of the Franconia, to whose culpable negligence-it was imputed, was indicted for manslaughter and found guilty. Pollock deferred judgment pending the decision of the question of jurisdiction by the court for the consideration of crown cases reserved, and concurred with the majority of that court in quashing the conviction. He took part in several other important decisions of the same tribunal. In the St. Paul's reredos case in 1889 he differed from Lord Coleridge, and his judgment was sustained by both the Court of Appeal and the House of Lords. Pollock was vice-president of the Rochester Diocesan Association, a member of the Commons' Preservation Society, and of the Board of Conservators of Wimbledon Common.

He died at his residence, The Croft, Putney, on 21 November 1897.

== Family ==
He married three times: first, on 1 September 1848, Nicola Sophia, second daughter of the Rev. Henry Herbert, rector of Rathdowney, Queen's County, Ireland; secondly, on 25 May 1858, Georgiana, second daughter of George William Archibald, LL.D., M.R., of Nova Scotia; thirdly, on 23 December 1865, Amy Menella, daughter of Hassard Hume Dodgson, master of the court of common pleas and cousin of Charles Lutwidge Dodgson. He had issue by all three wives.

== Works ==
Pollock was joint author, with J.J. Lowndes and Sir Peter Maxwell, of

- Reports of Cases argued and determined in the Queen's Bench Practice Court : with Points of Practice and Pleading decided in the Courts of Common Pleas and Exchequer (1850–1), London, 1851–2, 2 vols. 8vo.

He was also joint author, with F. P. Maude, of A Compendium of the Law of Merchant Shipping; with an Appendix containing all the Statutes of practical utility, London, 1853, 8vo; 4th ed. by Pollock and Sir Gainsford Bruce, 1881.

He was author of the following works:

- The Practice of the County Courts, London, 1851, 8vo; Supplements entitled
  - (1) An Act to facilitate and arrange proceedings in the County Courts, 15 & 16 Vict. c. 54; together with the Absconding Debtors Act, 14 & 15 Viet. c. 52, London, 1 852, 8vo.
  - (2) The Practice of the County Courts in respect of Probate and Administration, London, 1858, 8vo.
  - (3) Equitable Jurisdiction of the County Courts, London, 1865, 12rao); last edition, including supplements, revised by H. Nicol and H. C. Pollock, London, 1880, 8vo.
- A Treatise on the Power of the Courts of Common Law to compel the production of documents for inspection; with an Appendix containing the Act to amend the Law of Evidence, 15 & 16 Vict. c. 99, and notes thereto, London, 1851, 8vo;
  - reprinted with Holland and Chandler's Common Law Procedure Act of 1854, London, 1854, 12mo
