= Victualler =

Supplier of provisions for ships

A victualler (pronounced /ˈvɪt(ə)lə/) is traditionally a person who supplies food, beverages and other provisions for the crew of a vessel at sea.

There are a number of other more particular uses of the term, such as:

- The official supplier of food to the Royal Navy in the 18th and 19th centuries was the Victualling Board. A victualler was a supply ship at the time.
- An alternative term for a sutler, a person who sells provisions to an army.
- A licensed victualler, a formal name for the landlord of a public house or similar licensed establishment.
- In Ireland, victualler is a term for a butcher.
