= History of rail transport in Great Britain 1830–1922 =

History of railways in Great Britain between 1830 and 1922

- 1830–1922
History of rail transport in Great Britain to 1830	History of rail transport in Great Britain 1923–1947
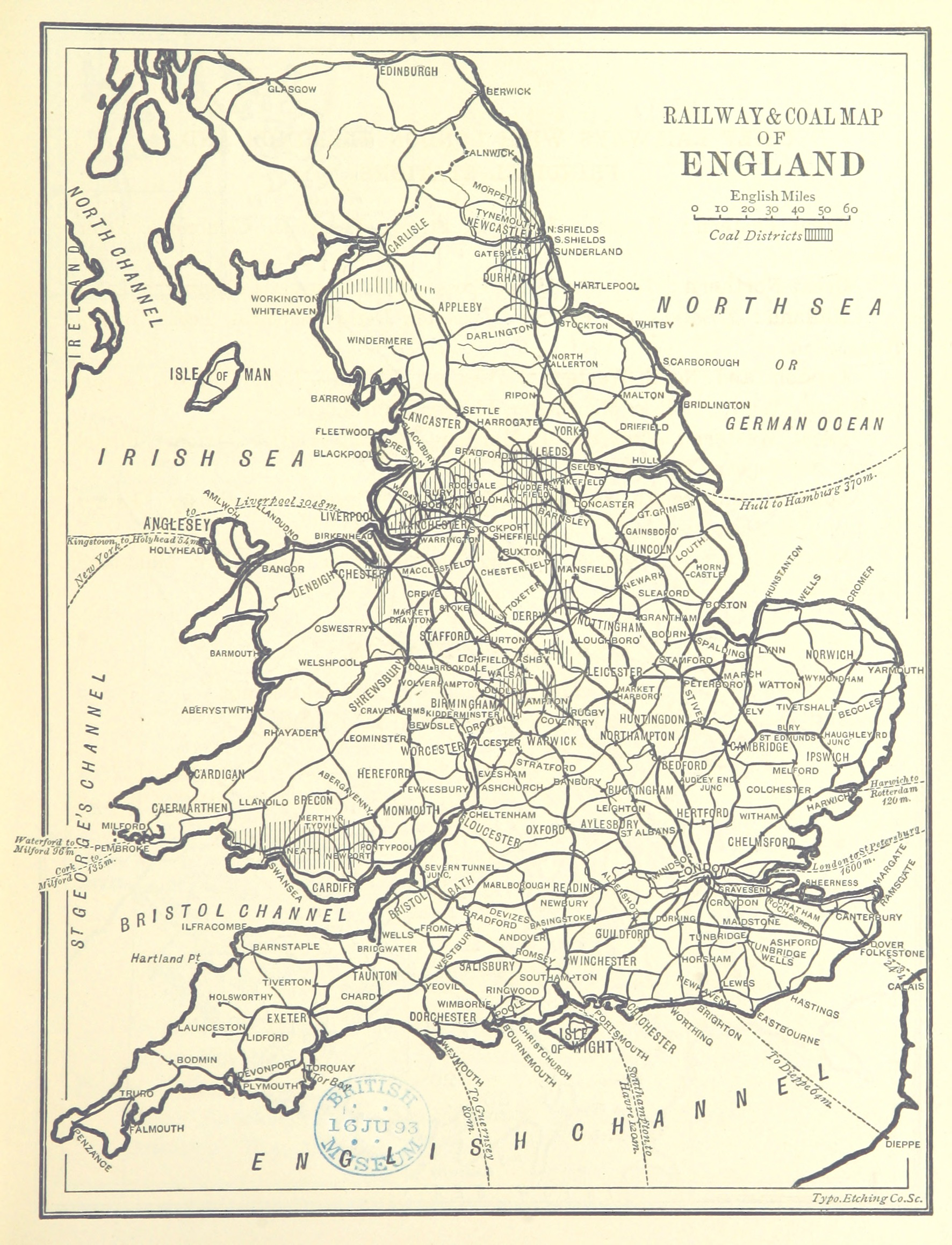
- 1890s map of railways

The history of rail transport in Great Britain 1830–1922 covers the period between the opening of the Liverpool and Manchester Railway (L&MR), and the Grouping, the amalgamation of almost all of Britain's many railway companies into the Big Four by the Railways Act 1921.

The inaugural journey of the Liverpool and Manchester Railway, by A.B. Clayton

== The 1830s ==
As Manchester had grown on cotton spinning, so Leeds had a growing trade in weaving. The Pennines restricted canal development, so the railway provided a realistic alternative, especially with the growth in coal usage from the mines in the North East and Yorkshire. A number of lines were approved in the area, such as the Leeds and Selby Railway, in 1830, which would link the former to the port of Hull, via the River Ouse.

While the L&MR had not ousted the Lancashire canal system from the transport of goods, there was an unexpected enthusiasm for passenger travel. The financial success of these lines was beyond all expectations, and interests in London and Birmingham soon planned to build lines linking these cities together and with Liverpool and Manchester via the L&MR. These two lines were the London and Birmingham Railway (L&BR), designed by Robert Stephenson, which ran from Euston Square, London, to Curzon Street, Birmingham; and the Grand Junction Railway, engineered by Joseph Locke, which ran from Curzon Street to an end-on junction with the Warrington and Newton Railway, a branch of the L&MR, at Dallam, near Warrington in Cheshire. The Grand Junction was designed to link the existing L&MR and the new L&BR; it opened on 4 July 1837, with the L&BR following a few months later.

Although acts of Parliament allowed railway companies compulsory purchase of wayleave, some powerful landowners objected to railways being built across their land and raised objections in Parliament to prevent the bill from being passed. Some landowners charged excessive amounts, so these early lines did not always follow the optimal route. In addition, steep gradients were to be avoided as they would require more powerful locomotives, while since speeds were expected to be less than about 30 mph, curves were considered less of a problem. It was the curves on these early lines that, a century later, would lead to British Railways' experimentation with, and later introduction of, tilting trains.

== Railway Mania ==
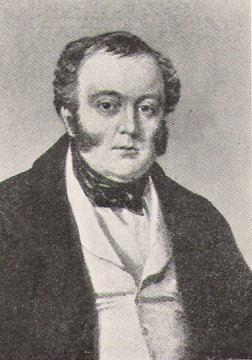
George Hudson

Although the government was in favour of the development of trunk railways to stimulate economic recovery and to facilitate the movement of troops in times of potential civil unrest, it was legally necessary that each line be authorised by a separate act of Parliament. While there were entrepreneurs with the vision of an intercity network of lines, such as those through the East Midlands, it was much easier to find investors to back shorter stretches that were clearly defined in purpose, where rapid returns on investment could be predicted.

The boom years were 1836 and 1845–1847, when Parliament authorized 8,000 miles of lines at a projected cost of £200 million, which was about the same value as the country's annual gross domestic product (GDP) at that time. A new railway needed an act of Parliament, which typically cost over £200,000 (about $1 million) to obtain, but opposition could effectively prevent its construction. The canal companies, unable or unwilling to upgrade their facilities to compete with railways, used political power to try to stop them. The railways responded by purchasing about a quarter of the canal system, in part to obtain the right of way, and in part to buy off critics. Once an act of Parliament was obtained, there was little government regulation. The railways largely had exclusive territory, but given the compact size of Britain, this meant that two or more competing lines could connect major cities.

George Hudson (1800–1871) became the most important railway promoter of his time. Called the "railway king" of Britain, Hudson amalgamated numerous short lines and set up a "Clearing House" in 1842 which rationalized the service by providing uniform paperwork and standardized methods for apportioning fares while transferring passengers and freight between lines, and loaning out freight wagons. He could design complex company and line amalgamations, and his activities helped to bring about the beginnings of a more modern railway network. In 1849 he exercised effective control over nearly 30% of the rail track then operating in Britain, most of it owned by four railway groups – the Eastern Counties Railway, the Midland, the York, Newcastle and Berwick, and the York and North Midland – before a series of scandalous revelations forced him out of office. The economic, railway, and accounting literatures have treated Hudson as an important figure in railway history, although concentrating largely on the financial reporting malpractices of the Eastern Counties Railway while Hudson was its chairman, which were incorporated into the influential Monteagle Committee Report of 1849. He did away with accountants and manipulated funds – paying large dividends out of capital because profits were low – but no one knew that until his system collapsed.

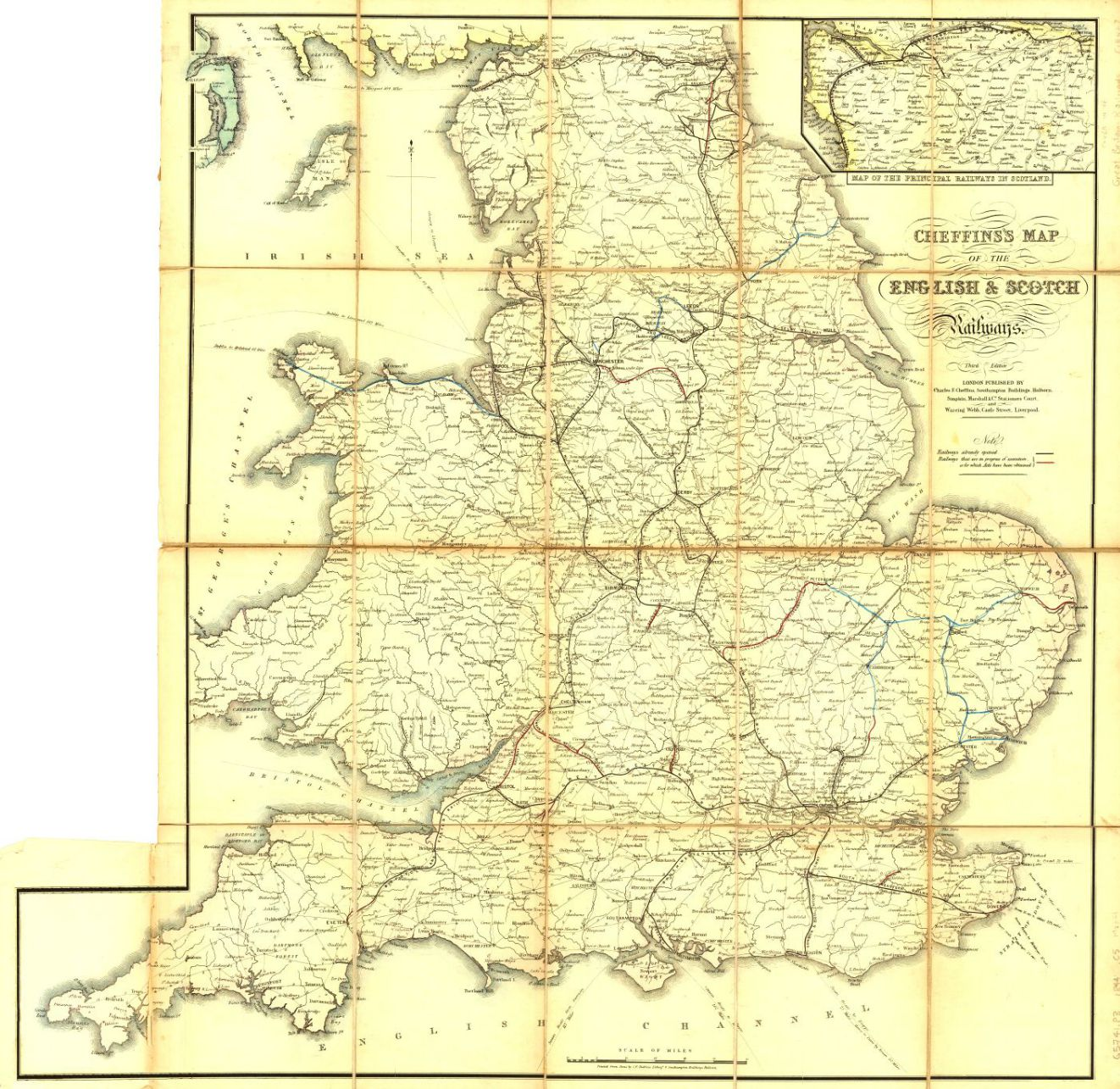
Cheffins' Map of English & Scotch Railways, 1850

All the railways were promoted by commercial interests; as those opened by the year 1836 were paying good dividends, financiers wanted to invest in them, and by 1845 over a thousand projected schemes had been put forward. This led to a speculative frenzy, following a common pattern: as the price of railway shares increased, more and more money was poured in by speculators, until the inevitable collapse in price. It reached its zenith in 1846, when no fewer than 272 acts of Parliament setting up new railway companies were passed. Unlike most stock market bubbles, there was a net tangible result from all the investment in the form of a vast expansion of the British railway system, though perhaps at an inflated cost. When the government stepped in and announced closure for depositing schemes, the period of "Railway Mania", as it was called, was brought to an end.

The commercial interests mentioned above were often of a local nature, and there was never a nationwide plan to develop a logical network of railways. Some railways, however, began to grow faster than others, often taking over smaller lines to expand their own. The success of the L&MR led to the idea of linking Liverpool to London, and from that the seeds of the London and North Western Railway (L&NWR) – an amalgamation of four hitherto separate enterprises, including the L&MR – were sown.

The legacy of the Railway Mania can still be seen today, with duplication of some routes and cities possessing several stations, sometimes with no direct connection between them, although a significant amount of this duplication was removed by the Beeching Axe in the 1960s. The best example of this is London, which has no fewer than twelve main line terminal stations serving its dense and complex suburban network, the result of the many railway companies that were competing during the Mania to run their routes in the capital.

== Government involvement ==
The railway directors often had important political and social connections, and used it to their company's advantage. For example, the directors of the Great Western came from elite backgrounds and typically had political influence when they joined the board. When an issue came up with the government, they knew whom to see in London. Landed aristocrats were especially welcome on the corporate boards. The aristocrats saw railway directorships as a socially acceptable form of contact with the world of commerce and industry. They leveraged the business acumen and connections gained through railways to join corporate boardrooms in other industries.

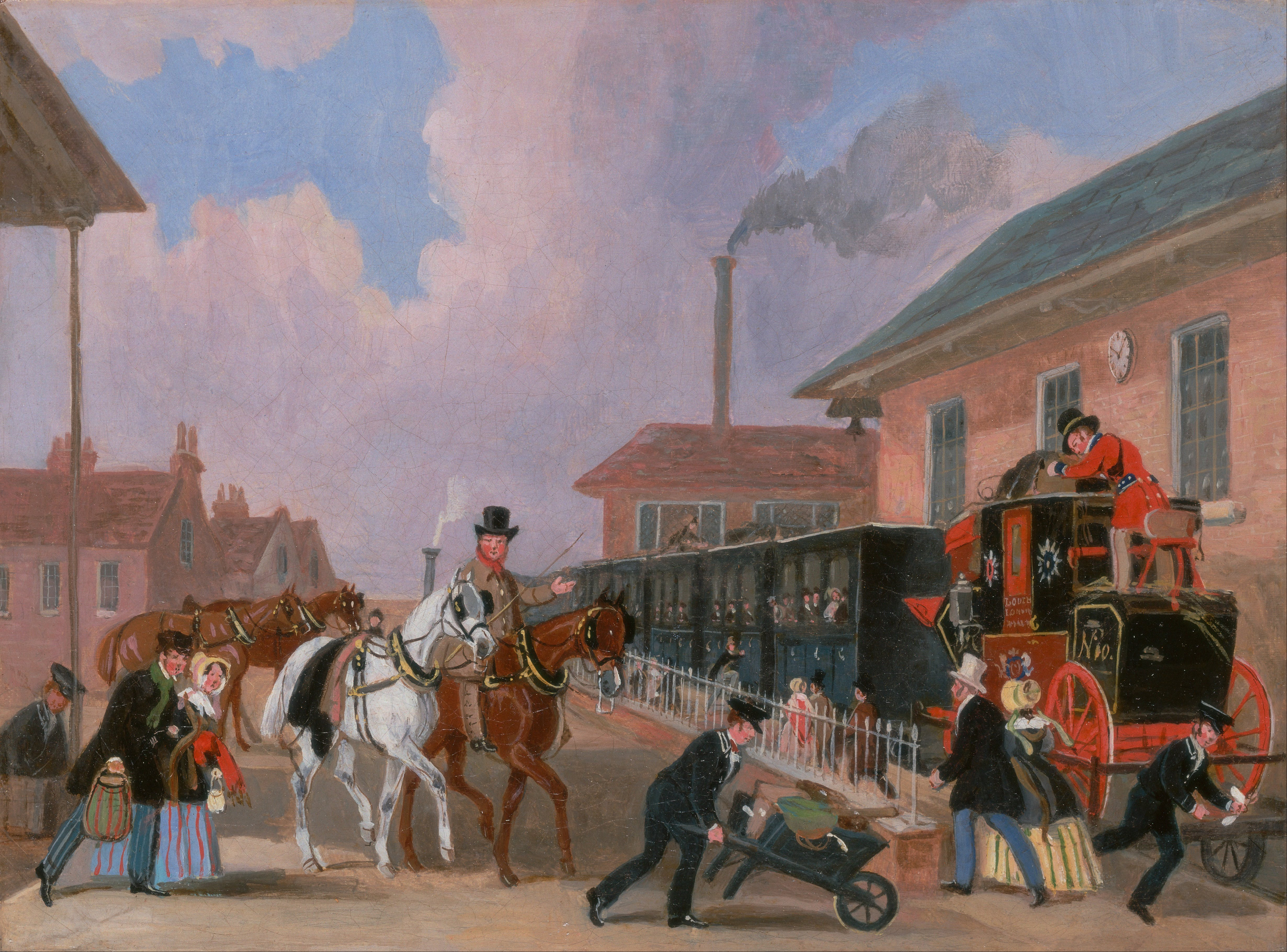
The Louth-London Royal Mail travelling by train from Peterborough East, 1845

While it had been necessary to obtain an act of Parliament to build a new railway, the government initially took a laissez faire approach to their construction and operation. The government began to take an interest in safety matters, with the 1840 "Act for Regulating Railways", which empowered the Board of Trade to appoint railway inspectors. The Railway Inspectorate was established in 1840 to enquire after the causes of accidents and recommend ways of avoiding them. The first investigation was conducted by Colonel Frederic Smith into five deaths caused by a large casting falling from a moving train in 1840 (Howden rail crash). He also conducted an enquiry into the derailment on the GWR when a mixed goods and passenger train derailed on Christmas Eve, 1841. The train hit a landslide at Sonning (Railway accident at Sonning Cutting), killing nine passengers. As early as 1844 a bill had been put before Parliament suggesting the state purchase of the railways; this was not adopted. It did, however, lead to the introduction to minimum standards for the construction of third-class carriages, an issue raised by the Sonning accident, which came to be known as "Parliamentary Carriages".

Public opinion was generally favourable, but there were dissenters, Charles Dickens in Dombey and Son (1846) discerned enormous interest in London, chiefly positive but with some negative elements:

There were railway patterns in its drapers' shops, and railway journals in the windows of its newsmen. There were railway hotels, coffee-houses, lodging-houses, boarding-houses; railway plans, maps, views, wrappers, bottles, sandwich-boxes and timetables; railway hackney coach and cabstands; railway omnibuses, railway streets and buildings, railway hangers-on and parasites, and flatterers out of all calculation. There was even railway time observed in clocks, as if the sun itself had given in.

Some opponents in 1835 saw the passing of a glorious era:

We denounce the mania as destructive of the country in a thousand particulars – the whole face of the Kingdom is to be tattooed with these odious deformities – huge mounds are to intersect our beautiful valleys; the noise and stench of locomotive steam-engines are to disturb the quietude of the peasant, the farmer and the gentleman....Railroads will in their efforts to gain ground do incalculable mischief. If they succeed they will give an unnatural impetus to society, destroy all the relations which exist between man and man, overthrow all mercantile regulations, overturn the metropolitan markets, drain the provinces of all their resources, and create, at the peril of life, all sorts of confusion and distress. If they fail nothing will be left but the hideous memorials of public folly.

== "The Battle of the Gauges" ==
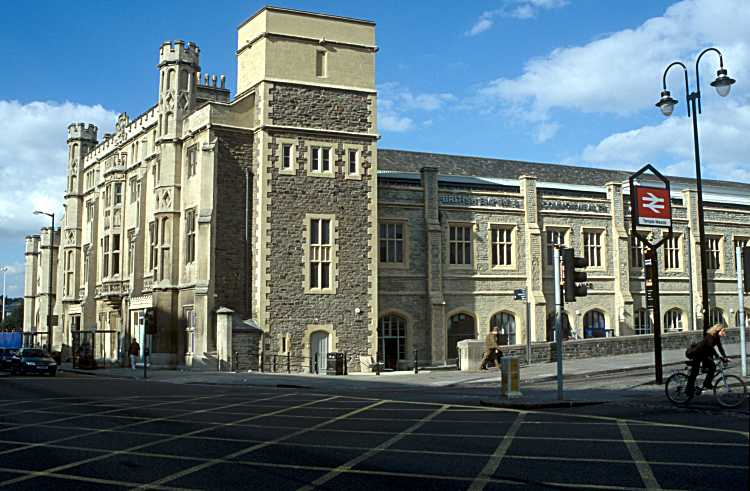
Bristol Temple Meads, the GWR terminus

George Stephenson built the L&MR to the same gauge as the tramroads in use in the North Eastern colliery railways he had grown up working on: a rail gauge of 4 ft 8 1/2 in (1,435 mm), and all railways built by him and his assistants adhered to that gauge. When Bristol businessmen wished to build their railway linking their city with London, they chose Isambard Kingdom Brunel as their engineer. Brunel favoured a wider gauge of 7 ft 1/4 in (2,140 mm). He felt that the different railways would not be in close enough proximity to warrant adherence to a uniform British gauge. Thus, the Great Western Railway (GWR) (completed in 1841) was constructed to Brunel's 'broad' gauge. However, his assumption proved incorrect, and when railways of a different gauge met, the inconvenience led to an officiating organization looking into the matter. Their conclusion was that Stephenson's "narrow gauge" should be adopted as Britain's standard gauge, and Parliament passed the Regulating the Gauge of Railways Act 1846 which stipulated the standard gauge of 4 ft 8 1/2 in (1,435 mm).

The undaunted GWR pressed ahead into the West Midlands, in hard-fought competition with the London and North Western Railway. Birmingham was reached in 1852, at Snow Hill and Wolverhampton at Low Level (the furthest-north broad-gauge station) in 1854. The Bristol and Gloucester Railway had been bought by the Midland Railway in 1846 and converted to standard gauge in 1854, bringing mixed gauge track (with three rails, so that both broad and standard gauge trains could run on it) to Bristol. By the 1860s the gauge war was lost; with the merger of the standard-gauge West Midland Railway into the GWR in 1861 mixed gauge came to Paddington, and by 1869 there was no broad-gauge track north of Oxford.

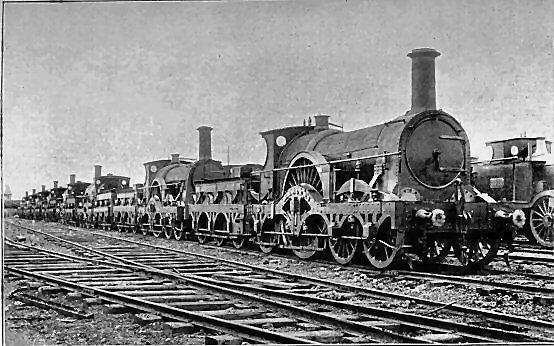
GWR Iron Duke Class broad gauge steam locomotives awaiting scrapping after broad gauge was abolished in 1892

Through this period the conversion to standard gauge continued, with mixed-gauge track reaching Exeter in 1876. By this time most conversions were bypassing mixed gauge and going directly from broad to standard. The final stretch of broad gauge on the national network was converted to standard in a single weekend in May 1892.

There is one small exception: The Holyhead Breakwater Railway, laid for the construction of the breakwater, was constructed at the broad gauge. Construction finished in 1870, and one locomotive was sold to a local company which had its own sidings leading to the dock. It continued to work this isolated network until 1913 when it wore out and the network was regauged.

== London ==
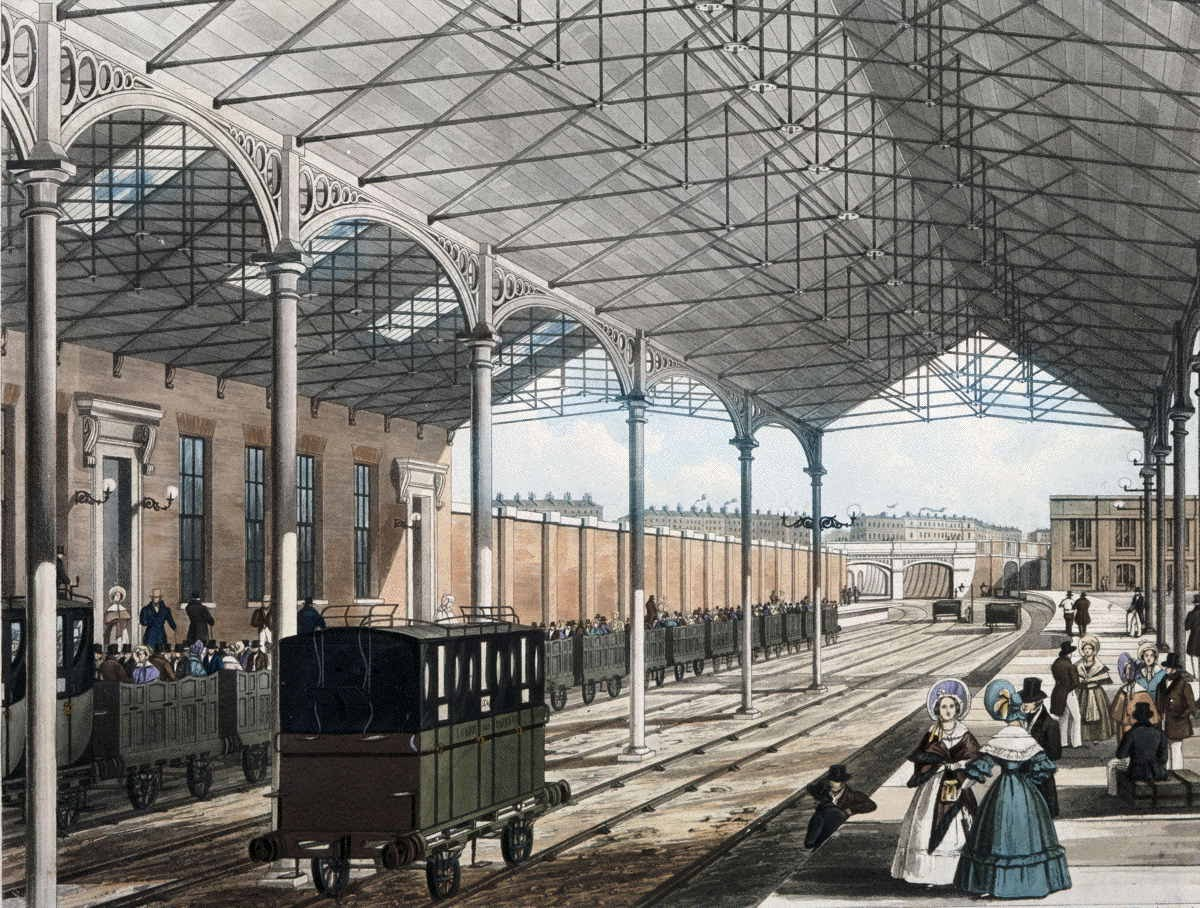
Euston station, showing the wrought iron roof of 1837. Note the open carriages.

By the 1850s, many steam-powered railways had reached the fringes of built-up London (which was much smaller than now), but the new lines were not permitted to demolish enough property to penetrate the City or the West End. Passengers disembarked at Paddington, Euston, King's Cross, Fenchurch Street, Charing Cross, Waterloo or Victoria and then made their own way via hackney carriage or on foot into the centre, thereby increasing congestion in the city. The Metropolitan Railway was built under the ground to connect several of these separate railway terminals. It opened in 1863, and was the first line of what was to become the London Underground. Marylebone was connected to the Bakerloo line in 1907, but Fenchurch Street was never connected to the system.

== Early successes ==
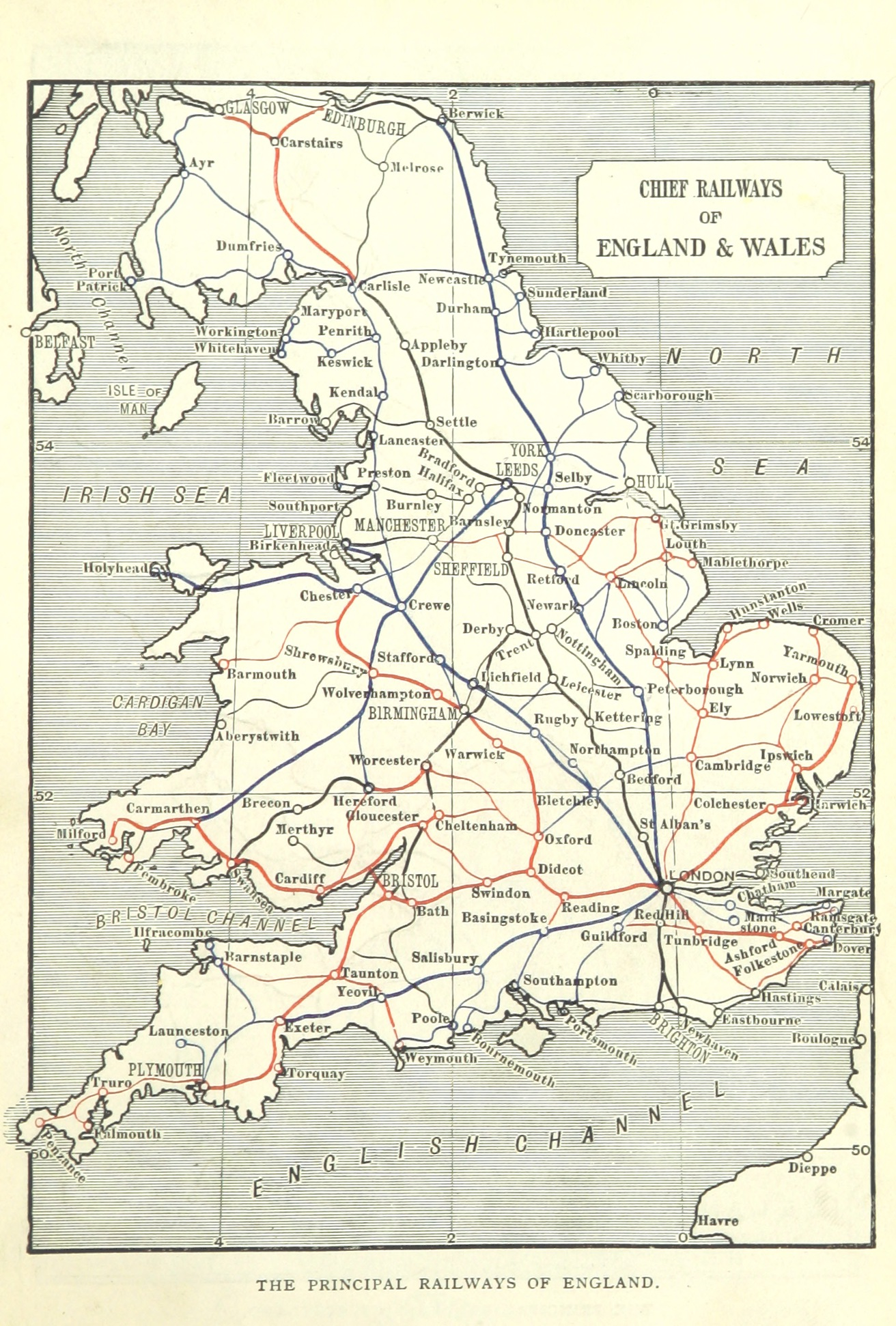
Railways in 1898

The financial success of the early railways was phenomenal, as they had no real competition. The roads were still very slow and in poor condition. Prices of fuel and food fell in cities connected to railways owing to the fall in the cost of transport. The layout of lines with gentle gradients and curves, originating from the need to help the relatively weak engines and brakes, was a boon when speeds increased, avoiding for the most part the need to re-survey the course of a line. Less than 20 years after the Liverpool line opened, it was possible to travel from London to Scotland by train, in a small fraction of the former time by road. Towards the end of the 19th century, competition became fierce between companies on the east and west coast routes to Scotland, leading to the "Race to the North".

By 1923 there were some nine major railways operating in England and five in Scotland. In addition there were smaller companies, such as the Cambrian Railways and the many South Wales lines; the Furness and Hull and Barnsley Railways in England; and many much smaller lines. A brief note about each of the larger companies will illustrate how they grew to the importance they had assumed by the time of the huge amalgamations which took place in 1923, in which all but a very few railways were absorbed. Each of the railways described briefly below have their own article.

== Major pre-grouping railway companies in Great Britain ==
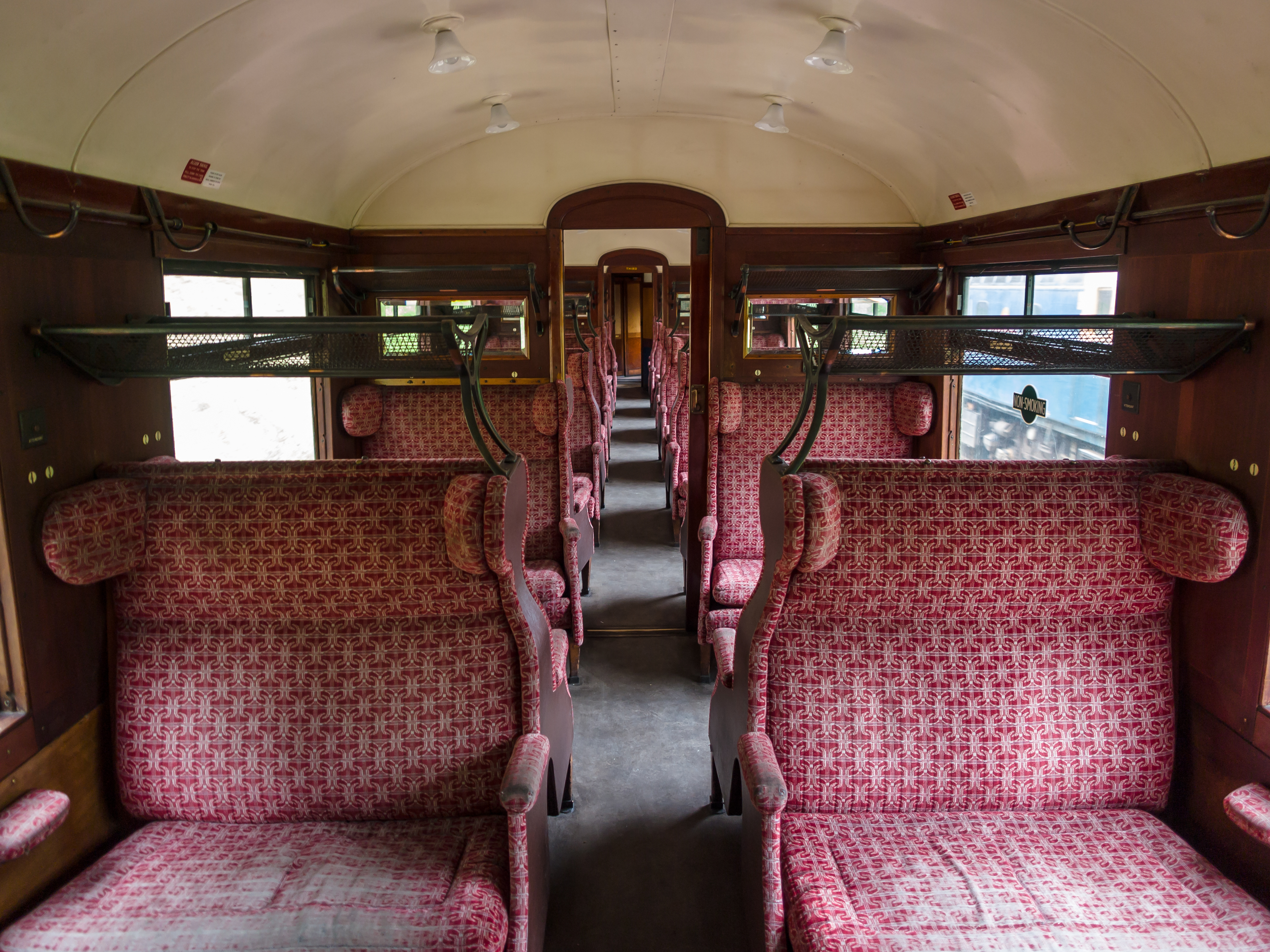
Early saloon car interior, Bluebell Railway

=== English railways ===
Great Central Railway (GCR)
the GCR developed from the Manchester, Sheffield and Lincolnshire Railway, which was formed from an amalgamation of various existing and proposed lines in the North and East Midlands. The MS&LR system was based around an east-west Trans-Pennine route, but in 1897 it began a new line via the East Midlands into London to a new terminus at Marylebone, and was renamed the GCR. It was the last major main line to be built in Britain, and was consequently engineered to a higher standard than earlier lines. After the opening of the London Extension in 1899, the GCR served an area between the East and West Coast Main Lines (see below), in competition with several other companies, especially the Midland Railway. After nationalisation the GCR network was effectively dismantled, leaving the East Midlands served only by the older Midland main line. Only the Marylebone to Birmingham section survives today.

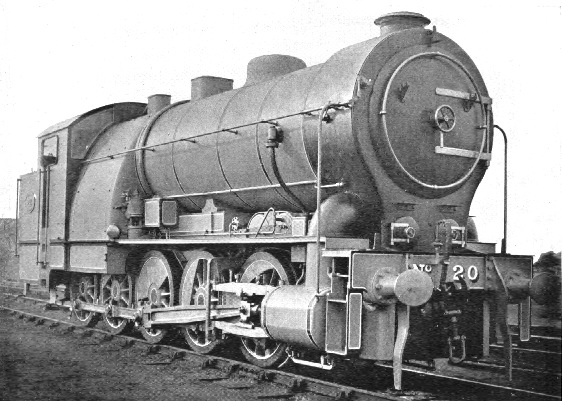
Great Eastern Railway Class A55 experimental locomotive, built c. 1902 to block a rivalling railway scheme

Great Eastern Railway (GER)
the GER was an amalgamation in 1862 of the Eastern Counties Railway with several smaller East Anglian lines; it also absorbed the Northern and Eastern Railway in 1902. It served the eastern counties of England: Cambridgeshire, Essex, Suffolk and Norfolk, as well an extensive suburban network in East London and Essex. It was one of the few pre-Grouping companies (another being the North Eastern Railway) to have a near monopoly of its territory. Its main London terminus was Liverpool Street.
Great Northern Railway (GNR)
the GNR began as an amalgamation in 1846 of two rival schemes: the London and York Railway and the Direct Northern Railway (both started in 1844). The GNR main line ran northwards from King's Cross to a joint station with the NER at Doncaster. Other lines served Lincolnshire and Derby Friargate. The GNR also had joint ownership of the Cheshire Lines Committee, giving access to Liverpool; other joint workings led to West Yorkshire (Leeds and Halifax); and it part-owned, with the Midland Railway, the Midland and Great Northern Joint Railway, serving parts of East Anglia. The GNR, with the NER and the NBR, operated the East Coast Main Line between London and Edinburgh.
Great Western Railway (GWR)
the GWR was incorporated in 1835 to construct a railway, operated on the broad gauge of 7 ft 1/4 in (2,140 mm), between Bristol and London. With the addition of several railways – including the Bristol and Exeter Railway (1876); South Wales Railway (1863); West Midland Railway (1863); South Devon Railway (1878); and the Cornwall Railway (1889) – the GWR territory took shape. The major routes, apart from the original line, served Weymouth, Plymouth and Penzance to the west; all of South Wales to Fishguard and Aberystwyth; Birmingham and Chester to the north-west. A working agreement with the LNWR extended the Chester line to Birkenhead on Merseyside. The broad gauge system resulted in what became known as the Gauge War: despite the technical advantages of broad gauge, it caused problems wherever the GWR met other companies' tracks, and eventually (in 1892) the last broad gauge line was abolished. The name "Great Western Railway", alone of all the pre-Grouping companies, was retained until the nationalisation of the railways; and one of the post-British Rail train operating companies now bears the name in 2005.

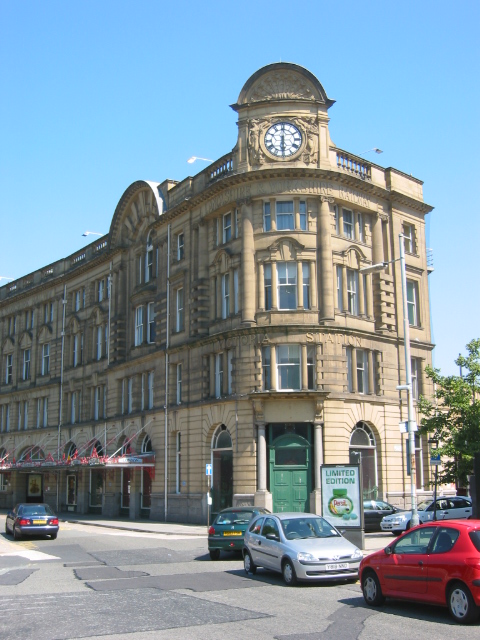
Manchester Victoria station, built by the Lancashire and Yorkshire Railway

Lancashire and Yorkshire Railway (L&YR)
the L&YR was incorporated in 1847; as with all the major railways it was the result of amalgamations, in this instance the Manchester and Leeds Railway which in 1859 joined the East Lancashire Railway to form the L&YR. Its lines covered the two counties, and served amongst others Manchester, Leeds, Liverpool, Preston, Doncaster and Goole. In 1922 the L&YR was combined with the LNWR, the Midland, and others, in the LMSR.
London and North Western Railway (LNWR)
the LNWR was formed in 1846 when four existing lines were amalgamated: the London and Birmingham Railway; the Liverpool and Manchester Railway; the Grand Junction Railway; and the Manchester and Birmingham Railway, making the LNWR the largest in the country at that time [420 miles (672 km)]. By 1923 its main line stretched from Euston station in London to Carlisle, with branches to Oxford and Cambridge; to Peterborough; and from Crewe to North Wales and West Yorkshire. It had running powers to enable its trains to reach Swansea and other parts of South Wales; and it also owned a railway in Ireland. The LNWR, together with the Caledonian Railway, operated the West Coast Main Line between London and Glasgow.
London and South Western Railway (LSWR)
Promoted as the London and Southampton Railway, the first section opened in 1838. By 1923 its main line extended from Waterloo in London via Woking, Basingstoke and Winchester to Southampton, Bournemouth, Poole and Weymouth. It also operated a main line from Waterloo via Guildford to Portsmouth (the "Portsmouth Direct line"), and another via Salisbury and Exeter to Plymouth running parallel to, but south of, the GWR main line. This route, known as "the Withered Arm", extended into Devon and Cornwall serving many of the south and south-west seaside resorts, served by what was known as the Atlantic Coast Express. The LSWR also had a busy suburban network in south-west London. The Somerset and Dorset Joint Railway was jointly owned with the Midland Railway.

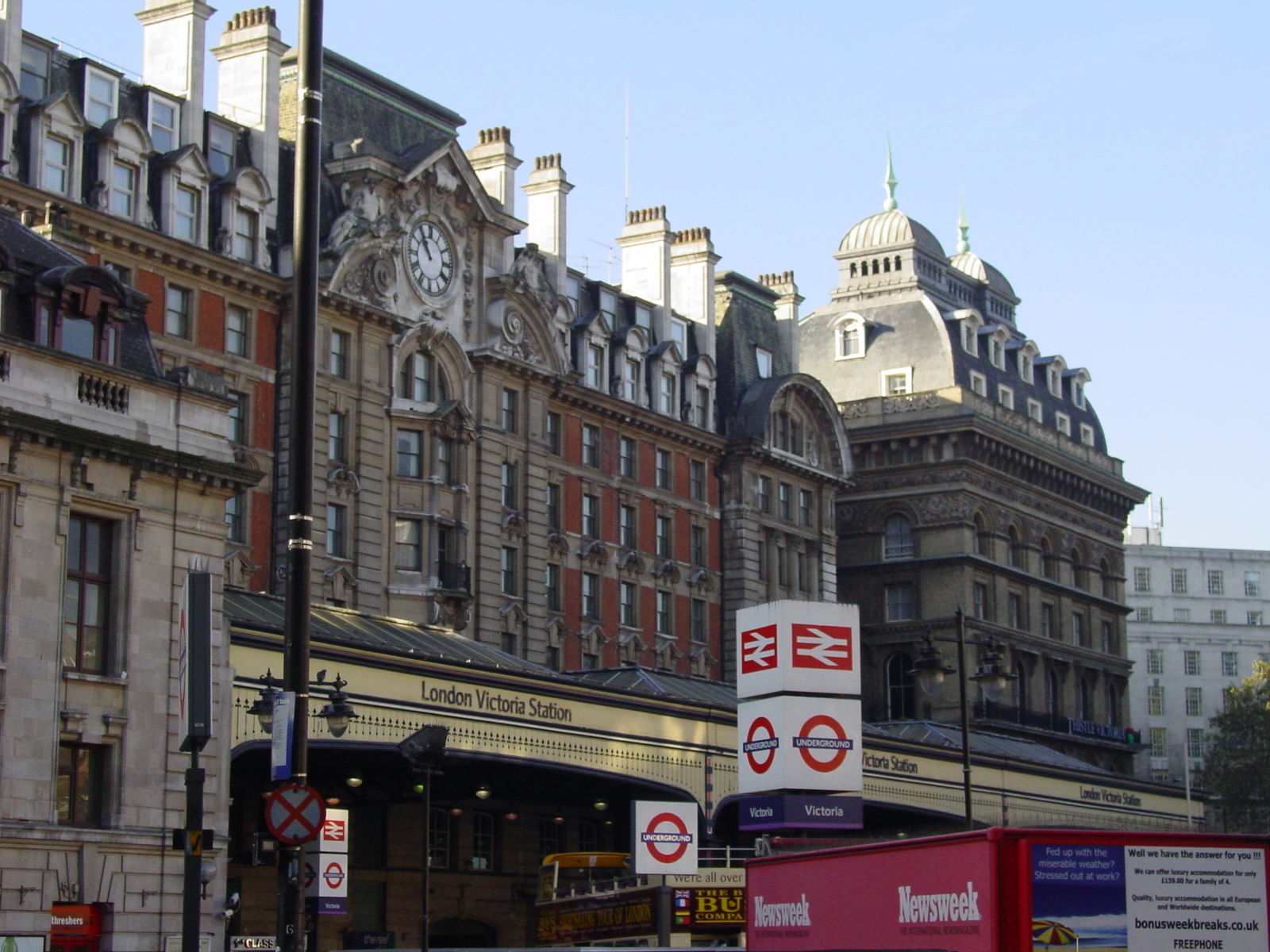
London Victoria station, used by the London, Brighton and South Coast Railway

London, Brighton and South Coast Railway (LB&SCR)
the LB&SCR began as the London and Croydon Railway (opened in 1839) and the London and Brighton Railway (1840). Its network of lines covered a large portion of the South London suburbs and served almost the whole of the county of Sussex, much of Surrey and some extensions into Kent and Hampshire. Many of the south coast resorts owe their existence to the line. Electrification began in 1909 on the overhead system; this was later changed to third rail when the LB&SCR became part of the Southern Railway.
Midland Railway (MidR)
the MidR was formed in 1844 with the amalgamation of three railways: the North Midland Railway; the Midland Counties Railway, and the Birmingham and Derby Junction Railway. In its early days it had no London terminus, using termini of other railways (the LNWR and the GNR) until 1862, when its grandiose London terminus at St Pancras was built. By 1923 its main lines ran from St Pancras to Carlisle, via Nottingham and Sheffield, and via Derby (the MidR headquarters) to Manchester. It also had a secondary main line from Derby through Birmingham to Bristol. It part-owned the Midland and Great Northern Joint Railway, serving east coast ports and resorts; the Somerset and Dorset Railway (with the L&SWR); and had access using other joint railways to reach Swansea in South Wales, Liverpool, and the port of Stranraer in Scotland. The latter route gave it access to its ownership of two of the Irish railways.

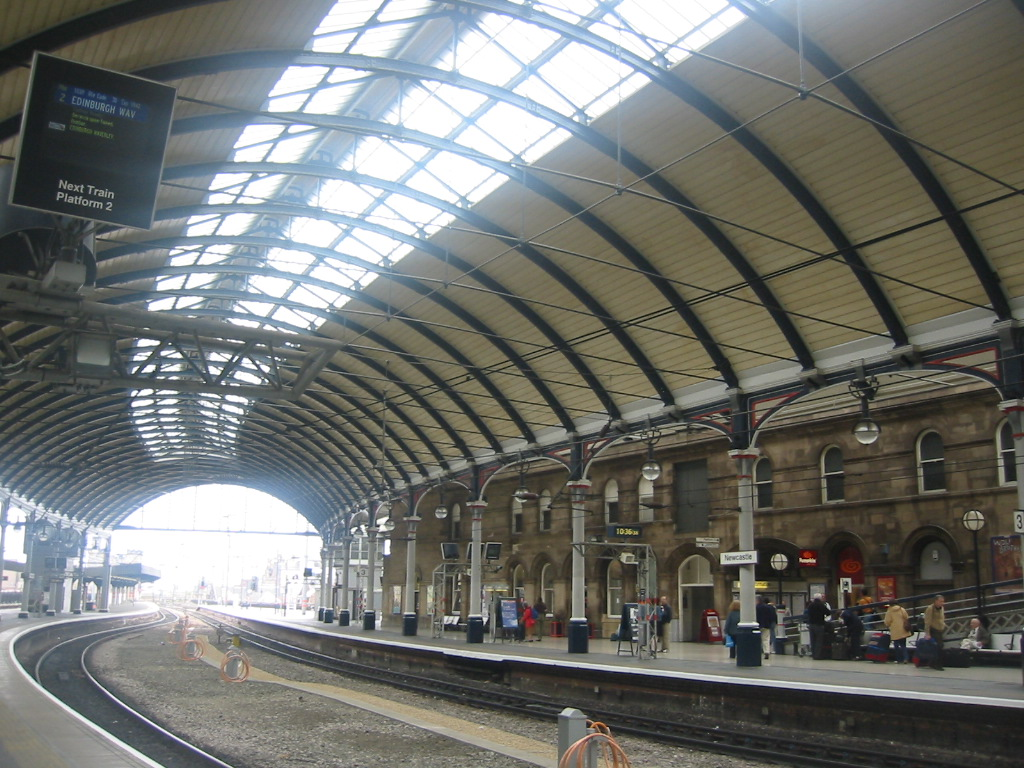
Newcastle Central Station, built by the North Eastern Railway

North Eastern Railway (NER)
the NER was formed in 1854 as the amalgamation of three railways: the York, Newcastle and Berwick Railway; the York and North Midland Railway; and the Leeds Northern Railway. Since it eventually included the Stockton and Darlington line, it was the successor to the first public steam railway in the world. At the time of the Grouping its main line ran from the joint station at Doncaster, through York and Newcastle-on-Tyne to Berwick-on-Tweed. It formed part of the East Coast Main Line, and its headquarters were at York. It had a larger tonnage of mineral and coal traffic at the beginning of the 20th century than any other railway in Britain.
South Eastern and Chatham Railway (SE&CR)
the SE&CR was a so-called working union in 1899 of two railways in the south east of England; the South Eastern Railway (opened in 1842) and the London, Chatham and Dover Railway (1859). Like the LB&SCR and the L&SWR, it had a large suburban traffic base and served many of the south east coast seaside resorts. As a result of merging the two networks it had more London termini than any other company: London Bridge and Victoria (both shared with LB&SC), Charing Cross, Blackfriars and Holborn Viaduct. Its main lines ran from these termini via Maidstone or Tonbridge, and Ashford, to Ramsgate, Dover, Folkestone and Hastings.

=== Scottish railways ===
The Caledonian Railway
Originally formed to provide the main railway line between Carlisle and Edinburgh and Glasgow. It later merged with the Glasgow, Paisley and Greenock Railway, which had opened in parts between July 1840 and March 1841. Together with the LNWR it operated the West Coast Main Line train services between London and Glasgow, and to Edinburgh, via Carstairs.

The Glasgow and South Western Railway (G&SWR)
First section opened 1850. Formed by a merger of the Glasgow, Paisley, Kilmarnock and Ayr Railway, which had opened in parts between August 1839 and August 1840, and the Glasgow, Dumfries and Carlisle Railway. Later took over the Ardrossan and Johnstone Railway, which had in part opened in 1831; it then became the Ardrossan Railway in July 1840 and was reopened in August 1840 after a change of gauge from 4 ft 6 in (1,372 mm) Scotch gauge to Standard gauge. The Paisley and Renfrew Railway, which had opened on 3 April 1835 as 4 ft 6 in (1,372 mm) Scotch gauge railway, was also taken over and converted to Standard gauge.

The Great North of Scotland Railway (GNoSR) (1854)
Serving the north east of Scotland from Aberdeen.

The Highland Railway (1865)
Main line northwards from Perth to Inverness with branches to Kyle of Lochalsh, Wick and Thurso.

The North British Railway (NBR) (1846)
Serving the Scottish Lowlands into Fifeshire, and the west coast to Mallaig. It took over the Edinburgh and Glasgow Railway, which opened July 1842, and the West Highland Railway, which opened 1894 and was extended to Mallaig in 1901.

== See also ==
- History of rail transport in Great Britain
- List of early British railway companies
