= Fatal Accidents Act 1976 =

Act of the Parliament of the United Kingdom

Fatal Accidents Act 1976 (Note: Section 7(1).)
- Act of Parliament
- Parliament of the United Kingdom
- Long title: An Act to consolidate the Fatal Accidents Acts.
- Citation: 1976 c. 30
- Territorial extent: England and Wales (Note: Section 7(3).)

Dates
- Royal assent: 22 July 1976
- Commencement: 1 September 1976 (Note: Section 7(2).)

Other legislation
- Amends: Animals Act 1971; Mineral Workings (Offshore Installations) Act 1971; See § Repealed enactments
- Repeals/revokes: See § Repealed enactments
- Amended by: Interpretation Act 1978; Limitation Act 1980; Administration of Justice Act 1982; International Transport Conventions Act 1983; Coal Mining Subsidence Act 1991; Petroleum Act 1998; Civil Partnership Act 2004; Fatal Accidents Act 1976 (Remedial) Order 2020; Marriage (Same Sex Couples) Act 2013 (Consequential and Contrary Provisions and Scotland) Order 2014

Status: Amended

Text of statute as originally enacted

Revised text of statute as amended

Text of the Fatal Accidents Act 1976 as in force today (including any amendments) within the United Kingdom, from legislation.gov.uk.

The Fatal Accidents Act 1976 (c. 30) is an act of the Parliament of the United Kingdom, that allows relatives of people killed by the wrongdoing of others to recover damages.

== Background ==
The Fatal Accidents Act 1846 (9 & 10 Vict. c. 93) had allowed claims for damages by the relatives of deceased persons for the first time. The 1976 act modernised the process and repealed earlier legislation.

== Provisions ==
The act allows claims as stipulated in s. 1(1):

If death is caused by any wrongful act, neglect or default which is such as would (if death had not ensued) have entitled the person injured to maintain an action and recover damages in respect thereof, the person who would have been liable if death had not ensued shall be liable to an action for damages, notwithstanding the death of the person injured.

The act allows claims under three heads:

- Dependency claim (s. 1) – A claim for economic loss by a restricted class of "dependant" defined in s.1(3).
- Bereavement claim (s. 1A) – A claim in recognition of grief by a further restricted class of "dependant", similar to a solatium in Scottish law. As of 1 May 2020, the amount of the bereavement claim award increased from £11,800 to £15,120.
- Funeral expenses (s. 3(5)) of the dependants.

An award must take account of any social security benefits received (s. 4).

=== Repealed enactments ===
Section 6(2) of the act repealed 8 enactments, listed in schedule 2 to the act.

Enactments repealed by section 6(2)
Citation	Short title	Extent of repeal
9 & 10 Vict. c. 93	Fatal Accidents Act 1846	The whole act.
27 & 28 Vict. c. 95	Fatal Accidents Act 1864	The whole act.
24 & 25 Geo. 5. c. 41	Law Reform (Miscellaneous Provisions) Act 1934	Section 2.
8 & 9 Geo. 6. c. 28	Law Reform (Contributory Negligence) Act 1945	Section 1(4). In section 4 the definition of "dependant".
7 & 8 Eliz. 2. c. 65	Fatal Accidents Act 1959	The whole of section 1 except for subsection (4). Section 2.
1971 c. 43	Law Reform (Miscellaneous Provisions) Act 1971	Part II, but not so as to affect a right to make an application under section 5(2).
1973 c. 38	Social Security Act 1973	In Schedule 27 paragraph 20.
1975 c. 54	Limitation Act 1975	In Schedule 1 paragraph 1.

== See also ==
- Fatal Accidents Act

== Bibliography ==
- Dow, D.; Lill, J. (2007). Personal Injury and Clinical Negligence Litigation. London: CLP. pp. Ch. 15. ISBN 1-905391-28-5.
- Law Commission (1997) "Consultation Paper – Claims for Wrongful Death", LCCP148
- Law Commission (1999) "Claims for Wrongful Death – A Final Report", LC263
- Lunney, M.; Oliphant, K. (2003). Tort Law: Text and Materials (2nd ed.). Oxford: Oxford University Press. pp. 851–868. ISBN 0-19-926055-9.
- Speiser, S. M. (1988). Recovery for Wrongful Death and Injury (3rd ed.). London: Callaghan. ASIN B001N4HP0A.
