= February 5 =

February 5 this year in various calendars
- Thursday, 5 February 2026
Akan	Nwonayaw
Armenian	20 Mehekani 1475
Aztec	Etzalcualiztli 6, 1 Ocēlōtl
Babylonian	16 Tebetu, 2336 SE
Balinese pawukon	Luang, Pepet, Beteng, Laba, Pon, Aryang, Wraspati of Uye, Brahma, Ogan, Manuh
Bengali	22 Magh, BS 1432
Chinese	Yang Metal Dog・Horn Mansion; Wood Snake Year, Month 12, Day 18 (Lichun, 13 days until Yushui)
Common Era	5 February 2026 CE
Coptic	28 Tobi, AM 1742
Egyptian	25 Payni, 2774 NE
Ethiopian	28 Ṭer, 2018 Amätä Məhrät
French Republican	Décade II, Septidi de Pluviôse de l'Année 234 de la République
Gregorian	5 February, AD 2026
Hebrew	18 Shevat, AM 5786
Hindu	Uttaraphalgunī・Atigaṇḍa; Solar: 23 Māgha, 1947 SE; Lunisolar: Caturthī, Kṛishna pakṣa of Māgha, 2082 VE; Siddhārthin・5126 KY・1,872,611
Icelandic	Fimmtudagur, 14 Þorri 2025
Islamic	17 Sha'aban, AH 1447 (using tabular method)
ISO week date	2026-W06-4
Japanese	18 Shiwasu, Reiwa 8 (Risshun, 14 days until Usui)
Julian	23 January, AD 2026 (AM 7534)
Julian day	2461077
Korean	18 Sodal, 4358 DE
Maya	13.0.13.5.14; 12 Pax, 1 Ix
Roman	ante diem X Kalendas Februarias, MMDCCLXXIX AUC
Solar Hijri	16 Bahman, SH 1404
Tibetan	19 rgyal, shing mo sbrul 2152 or 1771 or 999

<<	February					>>
Su	Mo	Tu	We	Th	Fr	Sa
1	2	3	4	5	6	7
8	9	10	11	12	13	14
15	16	17	18	19	20	21
22	23	24	25	26	27	28
2026

February 5 in recent years
2026 (Thursday)
2025 (Wednesday)
2024 (Monday)
2023 (Sunday)
2022 (Saturday)
2021 (Friday)
2020 (Wednesday)
2019 (Tuesday)
2018 (Monday)
2017 (Sunday)

February 5 is the 36th day of the year in the Gregorian calendar; 329 days remain until the end of the year (330 in leap years).

== Events ==
=== Pre-1600 ===
- 2 BC – Caesar Augustus is granted the title pater patriae by the Roman Senate.
- 62 – An earthquake with an estimated intensity between IX or X on the Mercalli scale occurs in Pompeii, Italy.
- 756 – An Lushan proclaims himself Emperor of China, founding the short-lived state of Yan.
- 1265 – Pope Clement IV is elected as the 183rd Bishop of Rome and head of the Catholic Church.
- 1576 – Henry of Navarre abjures Catholicism at Tours and rejoins the Protestant forces in the French Wars of Religion.
- 1597 – A group of early Japanese Christians are killed by the new government of Japan for being seen as a threat to Japanese society.

=== 1601–1900 ===
- 1783 – In Calabria, a sequence of strong earthquakes begins.
- 1810 – Peninsular War: Siege of Cádiz begins.
- 1818 – Jean-Baptiste Bernadotte ascends to the thrones of Sweden and Norway.
- 1852 – The New Hermitage Museum in Saint Petersburg, Russia, one of the largest and oldest museums in the world, opens to the public.
- 1859 – Alexandru Ioan Cuza, Prince of Moldavia, is also elected as prince of Wallachia, joining the two principalities as a personal union called the United Principalities, an autonomous region within the Ottoman Empire, which ushered in the birth of the modern Romanian state.
- 1869 – The largest alluvial gold nugget in history, called the "Welcome Stranger", is found in Moliagul, Victoria, Australia.
- 1885 – King Leopold II of Belgium establishes the Congo as a personal possession.

=== 1901–present ===
- 1901 – J. P. Morgan incorporates U.S. Steel in the state of New Jersey, although the company would not start doing business until February 25 and the assets of Andrew Carnegie's Carnegie Steel Company, Elbert H. Gary's Federal Steel Company, and William Henry Moore's National Steel Company were not acquired until April 1.
- 1905 – In Mexico, the General Hospital of Mexico is inaugurated, initially with four basic specialties.
- 1907 – Belgian chemist Leo Baekeland announces the creation of Bakelite, the world's first synthetic plastic.
- 1913 – Greek military aviators Michael Moutoussis and Aristeidis Moraitinis perform the first naval air mission in history, with a Farman MF.7 hydroplane.
- 1913 – Claudio Monteverdi's last opera L'incoronazione di Poppea was performed theatrically for the first time in more than 250 years.
- 1917 – The current constitution of Mexico is adopted, establishing a federal republic with powers separated into independent executive, legislative, and judicial branches.
- 1917 – The Congress of the United States passes the Immigration Act of 1917 over President Woodrow Wilson's veto.
- 1918 – Stephen W. Thompson shoots down a German airplane; this is the first aerial victory by the U.S. military.
- 1918 – SS Tuscania is torpedoed off the coast of Ireland; it is the first ship carrying American troops to Europe to be torpedoed and sunk.
- 1919 – Charlie Chaplin, Mary Pickford, Douglas Fairbanks, and D. W. Griffith launch United Artists.
- 1924 – The Royal Greenwich Observatory begins broadcasting the hourly time signals known as the Greenwich Time Signal.
- 1933 – Mutiny on Royal Netherlands Navy warship HNLMS De Zeven Provinciën off the coast of Sumatra, Dutch East Indies.
- 1941 – World War II: Allied forces begin the Battle of Keren to capture Keren, Eritrea.
- 1945 – World War II: General Douglas MacArthur returns to Manila.
- 1958 – Gamal Abdel Nasser is nominated to be the first president of the United Arab Republic.
- 1958 – A hydrogen bomb known as the Tybee Bomb is lost by the US Air Force off the coast of Savannah, Georgia, never to be recovered.
- 1962 – French President Charles de Gaulle calls for Algeria to be granted independence.
- 1963 – The European Court of Justice's ruling in Van Gend en Loos v Nederlandse Administratie der Belastingen establishes the principle of direct effect, one of the most important, if not the most important, decisions in the development of European Union law.
- 1967 – Cultural Revolution: The Shanghai People's Commune is formally proclaimed, with Yao Wenyuan and Zhang Chunqiao being appointed as its leaders.
- 1971 – Astronauts land on the Moon in the Apollo 14 mission.
- 1975 – Riots break out in Lima, Peru after the police forces go on strike the day before. The uprising (locally known as the Limazo) is bloodily suppressed by the military dictatorship.
- 1981 – Operation Soap: The Metropolitan Toronto Police Force raids four gay bathhouses in Toronto, Ontario, Canada, arresting just under 300, triggering mass protest and rallies.
- 1985 – Ugo Vetere, then the mayor of Rome, and Chedli Klibi, then the mayor of Carthage, meet in Tunis to sign a treaty of friendship officially ending the Third Punic War which lasted 2,131 years.
- 1988 – Manuel Noriega is indicted on drug smuggling and money laundering charges.
- 1994 – Byron De La Beckwith is convicted of the 1963 murder of civil rights leader Medgar Evers.
- 1994 – Markale massacres, more than 60 people are killed and some 200 wounded as a mortar shell explodes in a downtown marketplace in Sarajevo.
- 1997 – The so-called Big Three banks in Switzerland announce the creation of a $71 million fund to aid Holocaust survivors and their families.
- 2000 – Russian forces massacre at least 60 civilians in the Novye Aldi suburb of Grozny, Chechnya.
- 2004 – Rebels from the Revolutionary Artibonite Resistance Front capture the city of Gonaïves, starting the 2004 Haiti rebellion.
- 2008 – A major tornado outbreak across the Southern United States kills 57.
- 2016 – New Zealand politician Steven Joyce is hit by a flung rubber dildo in a Waitangi Day protest.
- 2016 – Cybercriminals initiate the Bangladesh Bank robbery, using the SWIFT network to fraudulently transfer $101 million from the Federal Reserve Bank of New York account of Bangladesh Bank.
- 2019 – Pope Francis becomes the first Pope in history to visit and perform papal mass in the Arabian Peninsula during his visit to Abu Dhabi.
- 2020 – United States President Donald Trump is acquitted by the United States Senate in his first impeachment trial.
- 2020 – Pegasus Airlines Flight 2193 overshoots the runway at Sabiha Gökçen International Airport and crashes, killing three people and injuring 179.

== Births ==
=== Pre-1600 ===
- 976 – Sanjō, emperor of Japan (died 1017)
- 1321 – John II, marquess of Montferrat (died 1372)
- 1438 – Philip II, duke of Savoy (died 1497)
- 1505 – Aegidius Tschudi, Swiss statesman and historian (died 1572)
- 1519 – René of Châlon, prince of Orange (died 1544)
- 1525 – Juraj Drašković, Croatian Catholic cardinal (died 1587)
- 1533 – Andreas Dudith, Croatian-Hungarian nobleman and diplomat (died 1589)
- 1534 – Giovanni de' Bardi, Italian soldier, composer, and critic (died 1612)
- 1589 – Esteban Manuel de Villegas, Spanish poet and educator (died 1669)
- 1594 – Biagio Marini, Italian violinist and composer (died 1663)

=== 1601–1900 ===
- 1608 – Gaspar Schott, German mathematician and physicist (died 1666)
- 1626 – Marie de Rabutin-Chantal, marquise de Sévigné, French author (died 1696)
- 1650 – Anne Jules de Noailles, French general (died 1708)
- 1703 – Gilbert Tennent, Irish-American minister (died 1764)
- 1723 – John Witherspoon, Scottish-American minister and academic (died 1794)
- 1725 – James Otis Jr., American lawyer and politician (died 1783)
- 1744 – John Jeffries, American medical doctor, scientist, military surgeon, and inspiration for National Weatherperson's Day
- 1748 – Christian Gottlob Neefe, German composer and conductor (died 1798)
- 1788 – Robert Peel, English lieutenant and politician, Prime Minister of the United Kingdom (died 1850)
- 1795 – Wilhelm Karl Ritter von Haidinger, Austrian mineralogist, geologist, and physicist (died 1871)
- 1804 – Johan Ludvig Runeberg, Finnish poet and hymn-writer (died 1877)
- 1808 – Carl Spitzweg, German painter and poet (died 1885)
- 1810 – Ole Bull, Norwegian violinist and composer (died 1880)
- 1827 – Peter Lalor, Irish-Australian activist and politician (died 1889)
- 1837 – Dwight L. Moody, American evangelist and publisher, founded Moody Church, Moody Bible Institute, and Moody Publishers (died 1899)
- 1840 – John Boyd Dunlop, Scottish businessman, co-founded Dunlop Rubber (died 1921)
- 1840 – Hiram Maxim, American engineer, invented the Maxim gun (died 1916)
- 1847 – Eduard Magnus Jakobson, Estonian missionary and engraver (died 1903)
- 1848 – Joris-Karl Huysmans, French author and critic (died 1907)
- 1848 – Ignacio Carrera Pinto, Chilean lieutenant (died 1882)
- 1852 – Terauchi Masatake, Japanese field marshal and politician, 9th Prime Minister of Japan (died 1919)
- 1866 – Domhnall Ua Buachalla, Irish politician, 3rd and last Governor-General of the Irish Free State (died 1963)
- 1870 – Charles Edmund Brock, British painter and book illustrator (died 1938)
- 1876 – Ernie McLea, Canadian ice hockey player (died 1931)
- 1878 – André Citroën, French engineer and businessman, founded Citroën (died 1935)
- 1880 – Gabriel Voisin, French pilot and engineer (died 1973)
- 1889 – Patsy Hendren, English cricketer and footballer (died 1962)
- 1889 – Ernest Tyldesley, English cricketer (died 1962)
- 1889 – Recep Peker, Turkish officer and politician (died 1950)
- 1891 – Renato Petronio, Italian rower (died 1976)
- 1892 – Elizabeth Ryan, American tennis player (died 1979)
- 1897 – Dirk Stikker, Dutch businessman and politician, 3rd Secretary General of NATO (died 1979)
- 1900 – Adlai Stevenson II, American soldier, politician, and diplomat, 5th United States Ambassador to the United Nations (died 1965)

=== 1901–present ===
- 1903 – Koto Matsudaira, Japanese diplomat, ambassador to the United Nations (died 1994)
- 1903 – Joan Whitney Payson, American businesswoman and philanthropist (died 1975)
- 1906 – John Carradine, American actor (died 1988)
- 1907 – Birgit Dalland, Norwegian politician (died 2007)
- 1907 – Pierre Pflimlin, French politician, Prime Minister of France (died 2000)
- 1908 – Marie Baron, Dutch swimmer and diver (died 1948)
- 1908 – Peg Entwistle, Welsh-American actress (died 1932)
- 1908 – Eugen Weidmann, German criminal (died 1939)
- 1909 – Grażyna Bacewicz, Polish violinist and composer (died 1969)
- 1910 – Charles Philippe Leblond, French-Canadian biologist and academic (died 2007)
- 1910 – Francisco Varallo, Argentinian footballer (died 2010)
- 1911 – Jussi Björling, Swedish tenor (died 1960)
- 1914 – William S. Burroughs, American novelist, short story writer, and essayist (died 1997)
- 1914 – Alan Lloyd Hodgkin, English physiologist, biophysicist, and academic, Nobel Prize laureate (died 1998)
- 1915 – Robert Hofstadter, American physicist and academic, Nobel Prize laureate (died 1990)
- 1917 – Edward J. Mortola, American academic and president of Pace University (died 2002)
- 1917 – Isuzu Yamada, Japanese actress (died 2012)
- 1919 – Red Buttons, American actor (died 2006)
- 1919 – Tim Holt, American actor (died 1973)
- 1919 – Andreas Papandreou, Greek economist and politician, Prime Minister of Greece (died 1996)
- 1921 – Ken Adam, German-born English production designer and art director (died 2016)
- 1923 – Claude King, American country music singer-songwriter and guitarist (died 2013)
- 1923 – James E. Bowman, American physician and academic (died 2011)
- 1924 – Duraisamy Simon Lourdusamy, Indian cardinal (died 2014)
- 1927 – Robert Allen, American pianist and composer (died 2000)
- 1927 – Jacob Veldhuyzen van Zanten, Dutch captain and pilot (died 1977)
- 1928 – Hristu Cândroveanu, Romanian editor, literary critic and writer (died 2013)
- 1928 – Tage Danielsson, Swedish author, actor, and director (died 1985)
- 1928 – Andrew Greeley, American priest, sociologist, and author (died 2013)
- 1928 – P. J. Vatikiotis, Israeli-American historian and political scientist (died 1997)
- 1929 – Hal Blaine, American session drummer (died 2019)
- 1929 – Luc Ferrari, French pianist and composer (died 2005)
- 1929 – Fred Sinowatz, Austrian politician, 19th Chancellor of Austria (died 2008)
- 1932 – Cesare Maldini, Italian footballer and manager (died 2016)
- 1933 – Jörn Donner, Finnish director and screenwriter (died 2020)
- 1933 – B. S. Johnson, English author, poet, and critic (died 1973)
- 1934 – Hank Aaron, American baseball player (died 2021)
- 1934 – Don Cherry, Canadian ice hockey player, coach, and sportscaster
- 1935 – Alex Harvey, Scottish singer-songwriter and guitarist (died 1982)
- 1935 – Johannes Geldenhuys, South African military commander (died 2018)
- 1936 – K. S. Nissar Ahmed, Indian poet and academic (died 2020)
- 1937 – Stuart Damon, American actor and singer (died 2021)
- 1937 – Larry Hillman, Canadian ice hockey player and coach (died 2022)
- 1937 – Gaston Roelants, Belgian runner
- 1937 – Alar Toomre, Estonian-American astronomer and mathematician
- 1937 – Wang Xuan, Chinese computer scientist and academic (died 2006)
- 1938 – Rafael Nieto Navia, Colombian lawyer, jurist, and diplomat (died 2024)
- 1939 – Brian Luckhurst, English cricketer (died 2005)
- 1939 – Jane Bryant Quinn, American financial journalist
- 1940 – H. R. Giger, Swiss painter, sculptor, and set designer (died 2014)
- 1940 – Luke Graham, American wrestler (died 2006)
- 1941 – Stephen J. Cannell, American actor, producer, and screenwriter (died 2010)
- 1941 – Henson Cargill, American country music singer (died 2007)
- 1941 – David Selby, American actor and playwright
- 1941 – Barrett Strong, American soul singer-songwriter and pianist (died 2023)
- 1941 – Kaspar Villiger, Swiss engineer and politician, 85th President of the Swiss Confederation
- 1942 – Roger Staubach, American football player, sportscaster, and businessman
- 1943 – Nolan Bushnell, American engineer and businessman, founded Atari, Inc.
- 1943 – Michael Mann, American director, producer, and screenwriter
- 1943 – Craig Morton, American football player and sportscaster
- 1943 – Dušan Uhrin, Czech and Slovak footballer and manager
- 1944 – J. R. Cobb, American guitarist and songwriter (died 2019)
- 1944 – Henfil, Brazilian journalist, author, and illustrator (died 1988)
- 1944 – Al Kooper, American singer-songwriter and producer
- 1944 – Tamanoumi Masahiro, Japanese sumo wrestler, the 51st Yokozuna (died 1971)
- 1945 – Douglas Hogg, English lawyer and politician, Minister of Agriculture, Fisheries and Food
- 1946 – Amnon Dankner, Israeli journalist and author (died 2013)
- 1946 – Charlotte Rampling, English actress
- 1947 – Mary L. Cleave, American engineer and astronaut (died 2023)
- 1947 – Clemente Mastella, Italian politician, Italian Minister of Justice
- 1947 – Darrell Waltrip, American race car driver and sportscaster
- 1948 – Sven-Göran Eriksson, Swedish footballer and manager (died 2024)
- 1948 – Christopher Guest, British-American actor and director
- 1948 – Barbara Hershey, American actress
- 1948 – Errol Morris, American director and producer
- 1948 – Tom Wilkinson, English actor (died 2023)
- 1949 – Kurt Beck, German politician
- 1949 – Maidarjavyn Ganzorig, Mongolian cosmonaut and academic (died 2021)
- 1949 – Yvon Vallières, Canadian educator and politician
- 1950 – Jonathan Freeman, American actor and singer
- 1950 – Rafael Puente, Mexican footballer
- 1951 – Nikolay Merkushkin, Mordovian engineer and politician, 1st Head of the Republic of Mordovia
- 1952 – Daniel Balavoine, French singer-songwriter and producer (died 1986)
- 1952 – Vladimir Moskovkin, Ukrainian-Russian geographer, economist, and academic
- 1953 – Freddie Aguilar, Filipino singer-songwriter and guitarist (died 2025)
- 1953 – John Beilein, American basketball player and coach
- 1953 – Gustavo Benítez, Paraguayan footballer and manager
- 1954 – Cliff Martinez, American drummer and songwriter
- 1954 – Frank Walker, Australian journalist and author
- 1955 – Mike Heath, American baseball player and manager
- 1956 – Vinnie Colaiuta, American drummer
- 1956 – Héctor Rebaque, Mexican race car driver
- 1956 – David Wiesner, American author and illustrator
- 1956 – Mao Daichi, Japanese actress
- 1957 – Jüri Tamm, Estonian hammer thrower and politician (died 2021)
- 1959 – Jennifer Granholm, Canadian-American lawyer and politician, 47th Governor of Michigan
- 1960 – Aris Christofellis, Greek soprano and musicologist
- 1960 – Bonnie Crombie, Canadian businesswoman and politician, 6th Mayor of Mississauga
- 1960 – Micky Hazard, English footballer
- 1961 – Savvas Kofidis, Greek footballer and manager
- 1961 – Tim Meadows, American actor and screenwriter
- 1962 – Jennifer Jason Leigh, American actress, screenwriter, producer and director
- 1963 – Steven Shainberg, American film director and producer
- 1964 – Laura Linney, American actress
- 1964 – Ha Seung-moo, Korean poet, pastor, historical theologian
- 1964 – Duff McKagan, American singer-songwriter, bass player, and producer
- 1965 – Tarik Benhabiles, Algerian-French tennis player and coach
- 1965 – Gheorghe Hagi, Romanian footballer and manager
- 1965 – Keith Moseley, American bass player and songwriter
- 1965 – Quique Sánchez Flores, Spanish footballer and manager
- 1965 – Jon Spencer, American singer, guitarist, and bandleader
- 1966 – José María Olazábal, Spanish golfer
- 1966 – Rok Petrovič, Slovenian skier (died 1993)
- 1967 – Chris Parnell, American actor and comedian
- 1968 – Roberto Alomar, Puerto Rican-American baseball player and coach
- 1968 – Chris Barron, American rock singer
- 1968 – Marcus Grönholm, Finnish race car driver
- 1969 – Bobby Brown, American singer-songwriter, dancer, and actor
- 1969 – Michael Sheen, Welsh actor and director
- 1969 – Derek Stephen Prince, American voice actor
- 1970 – Jean-Marc Jaumin, Belgian basketball player and coach
- 1970 – Darren Lehmann, Australian cricketer and coach
- 1970 – Jeremy Rockliff, Australian politician, 47th Premier of Tasmania
- 1971 – Michel Breistroff, French ice hockey player (died 1996)
- 1971 – Sara Evans, American country singer
- 1972 – Queen Mary of Denmark
- 1972 – Brad Fittler, Australian rugby league player, coach, and sportscaster
- 1973 – Richard Matvichuk, Canadian ice hockey player and coach
- 1973 – Trijntje Oosterhuis, Dutch singer-songwriter
- 1973 – Luke Ricketson, Australian rugby league player and sportscaster
- 1974 – Michael Maguire, Australian rugby league player and coach
- 1975 – Giovanni van Bronckhorst, Dutch footballer and manager
- 1976 – John Aloisi, Australian footballer and manager
- 1976 – Abhishek Bachchan, Indian actor
- 1977 – Ben Ainslie, English sailor
- 1977 – Adam Dykes, Australian rugby league player
- 1977 – Adam Everett, American baseball player and coach
- 1978 – Brian Russell, American football player
- 1978 – Samuel Sánchez, Spanish cyclist
- 1979 – Nate Holzapfel, American entrepreneur and television personality
- 1980 – Brad Fitzpatrick, American programmer, created LiveJournal
- 1980 – Jo Swinson, Scottish politician
- 1981 – Mia Hansen-Løve, French director and screenwriter
- 1981 – Loukas Vyntra, Czech-Greek footballer
- 1982 – Laura del Río, Spanish footballer
- 1982 – Kevin Everett, American football player
- 1982 – Tomáš Kopecký, Slovak ice hockey player
- 1982 – Rodrigo Palacio, Argentinian footballer
- 1983 – Anja Hammerseng-Edin, Norwegian handball player
- 1984 – Carlos Tevez, Argentinian footballer
- 1985 – Lloyd Johansson, Australian rugby player
- 1985 – Laurence Maroney, American football player
- 1985 – Cristiano Ronaldo, Portuguese footballer
- 1986 – Vedran Ćorluka, Croatian footballer
- 1986 – Kevin Gates, American rapper, singer, and entrepreneur
- 1987 – Alex Brightman, American actor, singer, and voice actor
- 1989 – Jeremy Sumpter, American actor
- 1990 – Dmitry Andreikin, Russian chess player
- 1990 – Bhuvneshwar Kumar, Indian cricketer
- 1990 – Jordan Rhodes, Scottish footballer
- 1991 – Nabil Bahoui, Swedish footballer
- 1991 – Gerald Tusha, Albanian footballer
- 1992 – Stefan de Vrij, Dutch footballer
- 1992 – Neymar, Brazilian footballer
- 1993 – Leilani Latu, Australian rugby league player
- 1993 – Ty Rattie, Canadian ice hockey player
- 1995 – Adnan Januzaj, Belgian-Albanian footballer
- 1996 – Stina Blackstenius, Swedish footballer
- 1997 – Patrick Roberts, English footballer
- 2001 – Kim Min-ju, South Korean actress
- 2002 – Jisung, South Korean rapper
- 2002 – Taehyun, South Korean singer-songwriter
- 2016 – Jigme Namgyel Wangchuck, Bhutanese prince

== Deaths ==
=== Pre-1600 ===
- 523 – Avitus of Vienne, Gallo-Roman bishop
- 994 – William IV, duke of Aquitaine (born 937)
- 1015 – Adelaide, German abbess and saint
- 1036 – Alfred Aetheling, Anglo-Saxon prince
- 1146 – Zafadola, Arab emir of Zaragoza
- 1578 – Giovanni Battista Moroni, Italian painter (born 1520)

=== 1601–1900 ===
- 1661 – Shunzhi, Chinese emperor of the Qing Dynasty (born 1638)
- 1705 – Philipp Spener, German theologian and author (born 1635)
- 1751 – Henri François d'Aguesseau, French jurist and politician, Chancellor of France (born 1668)
- 1754 – Nicolaas Kruik, Dutch astronomer and cartographer (born 1678)
- 1766 – Count Leopold Joseph von Daun, Austrian field marshal (born 1705)
- 1775 – Eusebius Amort, German theologian and academic (born 1692)
- 1790 – William Cullen, Scottish physician and chemist (born 1710)
- 1807 – Pasquale Paoli, Corsican commander and politician (born 1725)
- 1818 – Charles XIII, king of Sweden (born 1748)
- 1881 – Thomas Carlyle, Scottish philosopher, historian, and academic (born 1795)
- 1882 – Adolfo Rivadeneyra, Spanish orientalist and diplomat (born 1841)
- 1892 – Emilie Flygare-Carlén, Swedish author (born 1807)

=== 1901–present ===
- 1915 – Ross Barnes, American baseball player and manager (born 1850)
- 1917 – Jaber II Al-Sabah, Kuwaiti ruler (born 1860)
- 1922 – Slavoljub Eduard Penkala, Croatian engineer, invented the mechanical pencil (born 1871)
- 1927 – Inayat Khan, Indian mystic and educator (born 1882)
- 1931 – Athanasios Eftaxias, Greek politician, 118th Prime Minister of Greece (born 1849)
- 1933 – Josiah Thomas, English-Australian miner and politician (born 1863)
- 1937 – Lou Andreas-Salomé, Russian-German psychoanalyst and author (born 1861)
- 1938 – Hans Litten, German lawyer and jurist (born 1903)
- 1941 – Banjo Paterson, Australian journalist, author, and poet (born 1864)
- 1941 – Otto Strandman, Estonian lawyer and politician, 1st Prime Minister of Estonia (born 1875)
- 1946 – George Arliss, English actor and playwright (born 1868)
- 1948 – Johannes Blaskowitz, German general (born 1883)
- 1952 – Adela Verne, English pianist and composer (born 1877)
- 1954 – Hossein Sami'i, Iranian politician, diplomat, writer and poet (born 1876)
- 1955 – Victor Houteff, Bulgarian religious reformer and author (born 1885)
- 1957 – Sami Ibrahim Haddad, Lebanese surgeon and author (born 1890)
- 1962 – Jacques Ibert, French-Swiss composer (born 1890)
- 1967 – Leon Leonwood Bean, American businessman, founded L.L.Bean (born 1872)
- 1969 – Thelma Ritter, American actress (born 1902)
- 1970 – Rudy York, American baseball player, coach, and manager (born 1913)
- 1972 – Marianne Moore, American poet, author, critic, and translator (born 1887)
- 1976 – Rudy Pompilli, American saxophonist (Bill Haley & His Comets) (born 1926)
- 1977 – Oskar Klein, Swedish physicist and academic (born 1894)
- 1981 – Ella Grasso, American politician, 83rd Governor of Connecticut (born 1919)
- 1982 – Neil Aggett, Kenyan-South African physician and union leader (born 1953)
- 1983 – Margaret Oakley Dayhoff, American chemist and academic (born 1925)
- 1984 – El Santo, Mexican professional wrestler (born 1917)
- 1987 – William Collier Jr., American actor and producer (born 1902)
- 1989 – Joe Raposo, American pianist and composer (born 1937)
- 1991 – Dean Jagger, American actor (born 1903)
- 1992 – Miguel Rolando Covian, Argentinian-Brazilian physiologist and academic (born 1913)
- 1993 – Seán Flanagan, Irish footballer and politician, 7th Irish Minister for Health (born 1922)
- 1993 – Joseph L. Mankiewicz, American director, producer, and screenwriter (born 1909)
- 1993 – William Pène du Bois, American author and illustrator (born 1916)
- 1995 – Doug McClure, American actor (born 1935)
- 1997 – Pamela Harriman, English-American diplomat, 58th United States Ambassador to France (born 1920)
- 1997 – René Huyghe, French historian and author (born 1906)
- 1998 – Tim Kelly, American guitarist (born 1963)
- 1999 – Wassily Leontief, Russian-American economist and academic, Nobel Prize laureate (born 1906)
- 2000 – Claude Autant-Lara, French director and screenwriter (born 1901)
- 2004 – John Hench, American animator (born 1908)
- 2005 – Gnassingbé Eyadéma, Togolese general and politician, President of Togo (born 1937)
- 2005 – Michalina Wisłocka, Polish gynecologist and sexologist (born 1921)
- 2006 – Norma Candal, Puerto Rican-American actress (born 1927)
- 2007 – Leo T. McCarthy, New Zealand-American soldier, lawyer, and politician, 43rd Lieutenant Governor of California (born 1930)
- 2008 – Maharishi Mahesh Yogi, Indian guru, founded Transcendental Meditation (born 1918)
- 2010 – Brendan Burke, Canadian ice hockey player and activist (born 1988)
- 2010 – Harry Schwarz, South African lawyer, anti-apartheid leader, and diplomat, 13th South Africa Ambassador to United States (born 1924)
- 2011 – Brian Jacques, English author and radio host (born 1939)
- 2011 – Peggy Rea, American actress and casting director (born 1921)
- 2012 – Sam Coppola, American actor (born 1932)
- 2012 – Al De Lory, American keyboard player, conductor, and producer (born 1930)
- 2012 – John Turner Sargent Sr., American publisher (born 1924)
- 2012 – Jo Zwaan, Dutch sprinter (born 1922)
- 2013 – Reinaldo Gargano, Uruguayan journalist and politician, Minister of Foreign Affairs for Uruguay (born 1934)
- 2013 – Egil Hovland, Norwegian composer and conductor (born 1924)
- 2013 – Tom McGuigan, New Zealand soldier and politician, 23rd New Zealand Minister of Health (born 1921)
- 2014 – Robert Dahl, American political scientist and academic (born 1915)
- 2015 – K. N. Choksy, Sri Lankan lawyer and politician, Minister of Finance of Sri Lanka (born 1933)
- 2015 – Marisa Del Frate, Italian actress and singer (born 1931)
- 2015 – Val Logsdon Fitch, American physicist and academic, Nobel Prize laureate (born 1923)
- 2015 – Herman Rosenblat, Polish-American author (born 1929)
- 2016 – Ciriaco Cañete, Filipino martial artist (born 1919)
- 2020 – Kirk Douglas, American actor (born 1916)
- 2021 – Örs Siklósi, Hungarian singer (born 1991)
- 2021 – Christopher Plummer, Canadian actor (born 1929)
- 2023 – Pervez Musharraf, Pakistani military officer and politician, 10th President of Pakistan (born 1943)
- 2024 – Toby Keith, American country singer (born 1961)
- 2025 – Irv Gotti, American record producer, co-founded Murder Inc Records (born 1970)

== Holidays and observances ==
- Christian feast day:
  - Adelaide of Vilich
  - Agatha of Sicily
  - Avitus of Vienne
  - Bertulf (Bertoul) of Renty
  - Ingenuinus (Jenewein)
  - Roger Williams, Anne Hutchinson (Episcopal Church (United States))
  - 26 Martyrs of Japan (in Evangelical Lutheran Church in America and Anglican Church in Japan)
  - February 5 (Eastern Orthodox liturgics)
- Kashmir Solidarity Day (Pakistan)
- Runeberg Day (Finland)

== Sources ==
- Fentress, Elizabeth; Limane, Hassan (2018). Volubilis après Rome. Fouilles 2000-2004. Brill.
- Fremont-Barnes, Gregory (2002). The Napoleonic wars : the Peninsular War 1807-1814. Oxford: Osprey. ISBN 978-1-84176-370-5. OCLC 48627486.
