= Balloonomania =

18th and 19th century interest in balloons

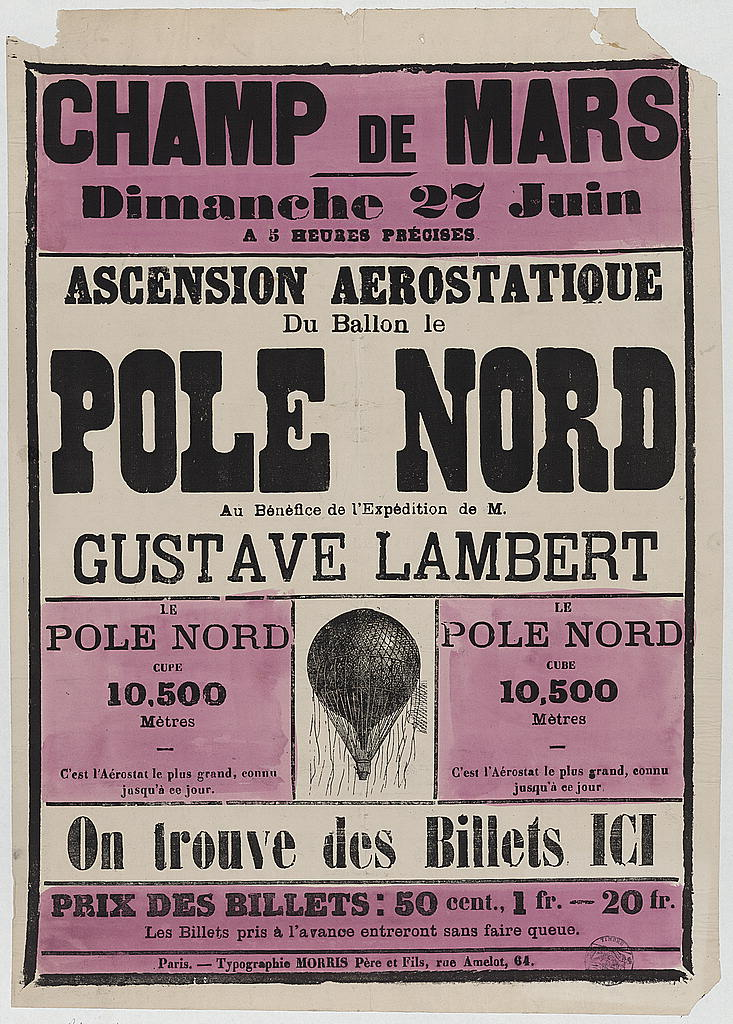
Advertisement for a public balloon demonstration flight by Gustave Lambert in Paris, 1869

Balloonomania was a strong public interest or fad in balloons that originated in France in the late 18th century and continued into the 19th century, during the advent of balloon flights. The interest began with the first flights of the Montgolfier brothers in 1783 (in a balloon inflated with hot air). Soon afterwards Jacques Alexandre César Charles flew another type of balloon (inflated with hydrogen) and both types of balloon were in use from then on. The fad quickly spread in France and across the channel in England.

== Origins ==
The science of lighter-than-air gases, and specifically the properties of oxygen, had been discovered as early as 1774 by Joseph Priestley, who noted its lightness and explosive qualities when heated. The chemistry of lighter-than-air and heated gasses was eventually put to the test by the Montgolfier brothers, two paper manufacturers in France, while experimenting with heated air caught in paper bags. Balloonomania saw its true origins, however, in the first public balloon flight on April 3rd 1783, with the launching of a large unmanned paper balloon (inflated with hot air) in the countryside near Annonay. The balloon, which had been constructed by the Mongolfier brothers, was thirty feet tall, made of paper, and appears to have been intended as an advertising gimmick for the Montgolfier's paper manufacturing company. It was effective, as it drew an enormous crowd of onlookers.

Later balloonists such as Jean-Pierre Blanchard and Vincent Lunardi exploited this wonder at the novelty of balloons to draw large crowds and gain personal fame, Lunardi going so far as to proclaim himself an "idol of the whole nation [of England]" in a letter to his guardian.

== Effect on society ==
=== Public responses ===
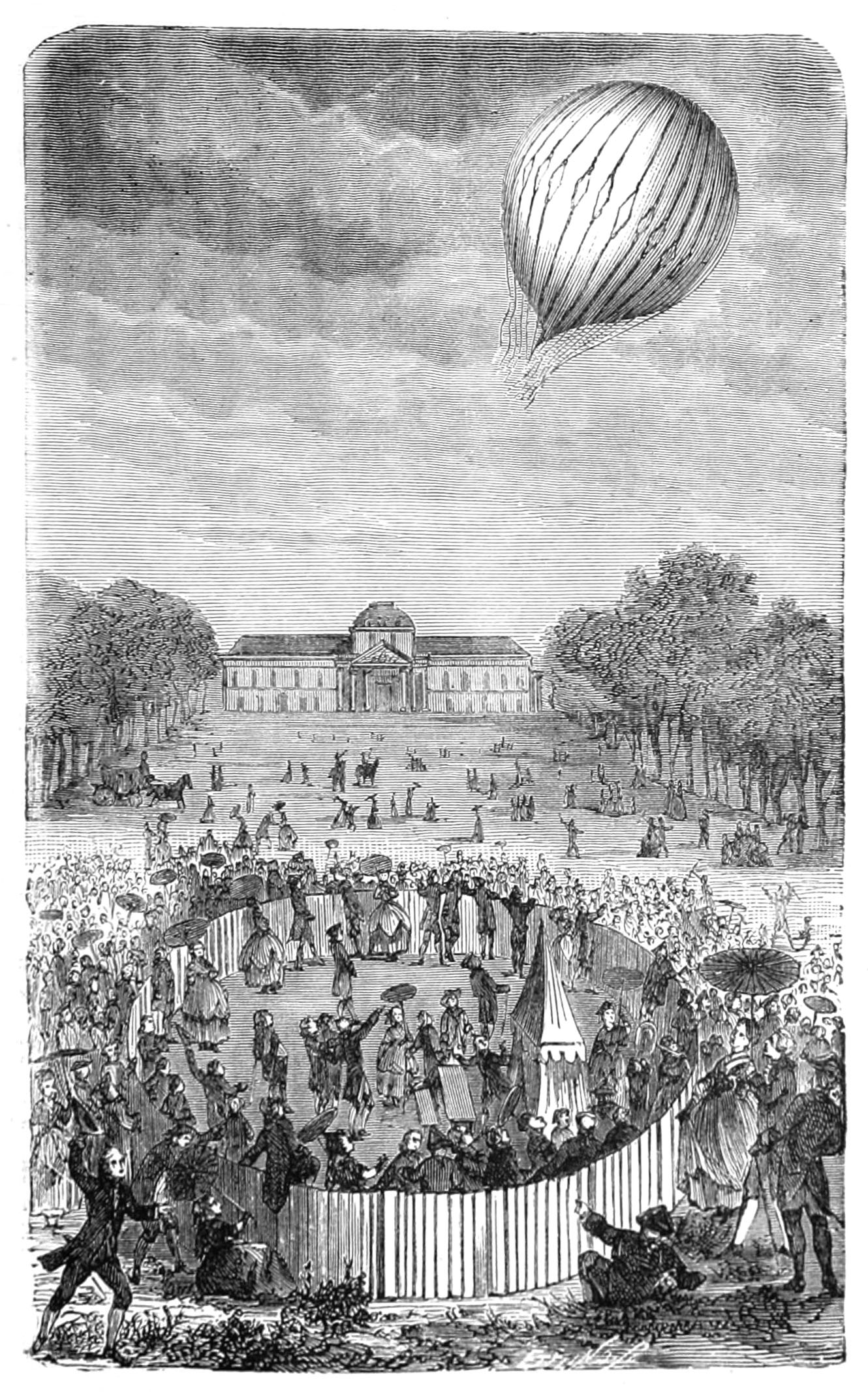
The Ascent of Charles's Balloon from the Champ de Mars, as depicted in Wonderful Balloon Ascents (1870)

Early ballooning was met with mixed responses. Crowds of hundreds or thousands of enthusiastic onlookers would turn out for a balloon launch, even threatening to riot if the launch was delayed. Some, however, were not quite as impressed, as shown by the events of August 27, 1783, when professor Jacques Alexandre César Charles, who had been commissioned to build a rival balloon to the Montgolfier's version using hydrogen, launched his balloon from the Champ de Mars before a large crowd including American scientist Benjamin Franklin. The balloon travelled for "forty-five minutes and fifteen miles to the village of Genoesse, where it was attacked by frightened peasants on landing."

Regardless of these negative reactions, which were not in the majority, ballooning quickly caught the imagination of the general populace, with a crowd of up to 400,000 clamoring to see Jacques Charles make a manned ascent in Paris on December 1, 1783. Both Blanchard and Lunardi became famous for their ballooning stunts, with Blanchard and his companion John Jeffries being the first to cross the English Channel in a balloon on January 7, 1785.

The French magazine Mercure de France announced the rise of "balloon mania" on June 5, 1783, referring to an outpouring of extravagant fashion and luxury goods inspired by ballooning. This included hats á la Montgolfier and á la Blanchard, named after the pioneering balloonists, and possibly the robe retroussée dans les poches style of dresses.

=== Academic and scientific responses ===
The public reaction among intellectuals and academics was generally cooler, with some critics of balloonomania including the likes of Sir Joseph Banks and Samuel Johnson, who wrote in a 1783 letter to Hester Thrale, who had inquired about the nature of balloons: "Happy are you, Madam, that have ease and leisure to want intelligence of air balloons. Their existence is, I believe, indubitable, but I know not that they can possibly be of any use." Sir Joseph Banks, a prominent natural scientist wrote that he was skeptical of the utility of balloons, though he recognized the revolutionary science behind it: "I see an inclination in the more respectable part of the Royal Society to guard against the Ballomania until some experiment like to prove beneficial either to society or to science is proposed." However, both men and other scientists and academics would express some personal interest in ballooning, and suggest possible practical purposes, with Banks originally suggesting that perhaps balloons could be used as a way of counterbalancing the weight of a cart or coach, making them easier to move over the ground. Even Johnson recognized the potential for exploration, stating, "How easily shall we trace the Nile through all its passages; pass over to distant regions and examine the face of nature, from one extremity of the Earth to the other." Blanchard's companion Dr. John Jeffries considered ballooning to be a major part of an exploration of the secrets of flight, the nature of the upper atmosphere, and the formation of weather, and took instruments such as a mercury barometer, a thermometer, a hydrometer and an electrometer to take different measurements of the upper atmosphere. There were other positive scientific responses, as well. Upon receiving a letter from a friend chronicling a balloon flight, the astronomer William Herschel began to think of balloons as possibly useful for observation, as they might carry telescopes into the upper air, where it was clearer. This idea would eventually evolve into sending telescopes into orbit.

=== Collectibles and cartoons ===
At its peak, balloonomania triggered a revolution in souvenirs and collectibles, with balloons being featured on "plates, cups, clocks, ivory draughts pieces, snuffboxes, bracelets, tobacco pipes, hairclips, tiepins, even a porcelain bidet with a balloon design painted on the interior." These collectibles proved to be enormously popular among the French populace, starting in the winter of 1783. With the rise of public interest in ballooning, they soon became the subjects of mockery. "Many sexually suggestive cartoons soon appeared: the inevitable balloon-breasted girls lifted off their feet, monstrous aeronauts inflated by gas enemas, or 'inflammable' women carrying men off into the clouds."

=== Literature ===
Balloonomania, merely as a novelty, served as the inspiration for various poets, such as Edward Nares, author of the Ballooniad, a street ballad about ballooning, which mentioned the notion of flying to the moon.

Advent'rous youth! What urged thy distant flight,
Beyond the finite ken of human sight?
Seest thou yon silver orb men call the moon?
Thither now speed thee with thy air balloon.

— Edward Nares

Balloonomania would exert a pull on the imaginations of some of the Romantic poets as well. Ballooning appealed to Romantic writer's ideas of the sublime, such as Samuel Taylor Coleridge, who wrote of balloons as being "an image of human longing and inspiration, both uplifting and terrifying" and William Wordsworth, who opened the poem "Peter Bell" with the image of a balloon boat:

There's something in a flying Horse,
There's something in a huge balloon:
But through the Clouds I'll never float
Until I have a little Boat
Shaped like the crescent-moon.

— William Wordsworth

Their point was not lost on the balloonists themselves, as Dr. Alexandre Charles found himself making the first solo voyage in a balloon (inflated with hydrogen) on December 1, 1783, an unplanned accident after Dr. Charles' companion stepped out of the balloon, which then relaunched itself with only Charles inside. He wrote, "Never has a man felt so solitary, so sublime-and so utterly terrified." Dr. Charles never went up in a balloon again.

Percy Shelley also wrote of balloons, saying: "It would seem a mere toy, a feather, in comparison with the splendid anticipations of the philosophical chemist. Yet it ought not to be altogether condemned, It promises prodigious faculties for locomotion, and will allow us to traverse vast tracts with ease and rapidity, and to explore unknown countries without difficulty. Why are we so ignorant of the interior of Africa?—Why do we not dispatch intrepid aeronauts to cross it in every direction and to survey the whole peninsula in a few weeks? The shadow of the first balloon… as it glided over that unhappy country, would virtually emancipate every slave, and would annihilate slavery forever." Shelley also wrote a sonnet entitled "To a balloon, laden with Knowledge" which reads:

Bright ball of flame that thro the gloom of even
Silently takest thine etherial way
And with surpassing glory dimmst each ray
Twinkling amid the dark blue Depths of Heaven
Unlike the Fire thou bearest, soon shall thou
Fade like a meteor in surrounding gloom
Whilst that unquencheable is doomed to glow
A watch light by the patriots lonely tomb
A ray of courage to the opprest & poor,
A spark tho' gleaming on the hovel's hearth
Which thro the tyrants gilded domes shall roar
A beacon in the darkness of the Earth
A Sun which oer the renovated scene
Shall dart like Truth where Falshood [sic] yet has been

— Percy Shelley

Balloonomania was not universal amongst the Romantic poets, however. In contrast to Coleridge, Wordsworth and Shelley, William Blake mocked and satirized the idea of manned flight in his unfinished prose work "An Island in the Moon". Even after the end of the Romantic period, Balloonomania continued to have an effect on later literary work, including on the early science fiction writer Jules Verne who wrote the book Five Weeks in a Balloon in 1863, about the ballooning adventures of two explorers and their manservant in Africa.

=== Military ===
The military applications of balloons were recognized early, with Joseph Montgolfier jokingly suggesting in 1782 that the French could fly an entire army suspended underneath hundreds of paper bags into Gibraltar to seize it from the British. Military leaders and political leaders soon began to see a more practical potential for balloons to be used in warfare; specifically in the role of reconnaissance. The first recorded use of a balloon in warfare was the deployment of a balloon called L'Entrepremant by the French at the battle of Fleurus in 1794, which resulted in a French victory over a coalition of British and Austrian forces. After that victory, Napoleon started an air balloon corps based in Meudon, and there were fears in England of an aerial invasion, though this never came to pass. Napoleon took his balloon corps to Egypt in 1798, but their equipment was destroyed by Horatio Nelson at the Battle of Aboukir, and Napoleon disbanded his balloon corps in 1799. Balloons would later be used in the American Civil War for reconnaissance and directing artillery barrages on foes that were out of view of the artillerymen on the ground.

== See also ==
- Bike boom
- Canal mania
- French Revolution
- Parachuting animals
- Railway mania
