= Parachuting animals =

Parachute descents by non-human animals

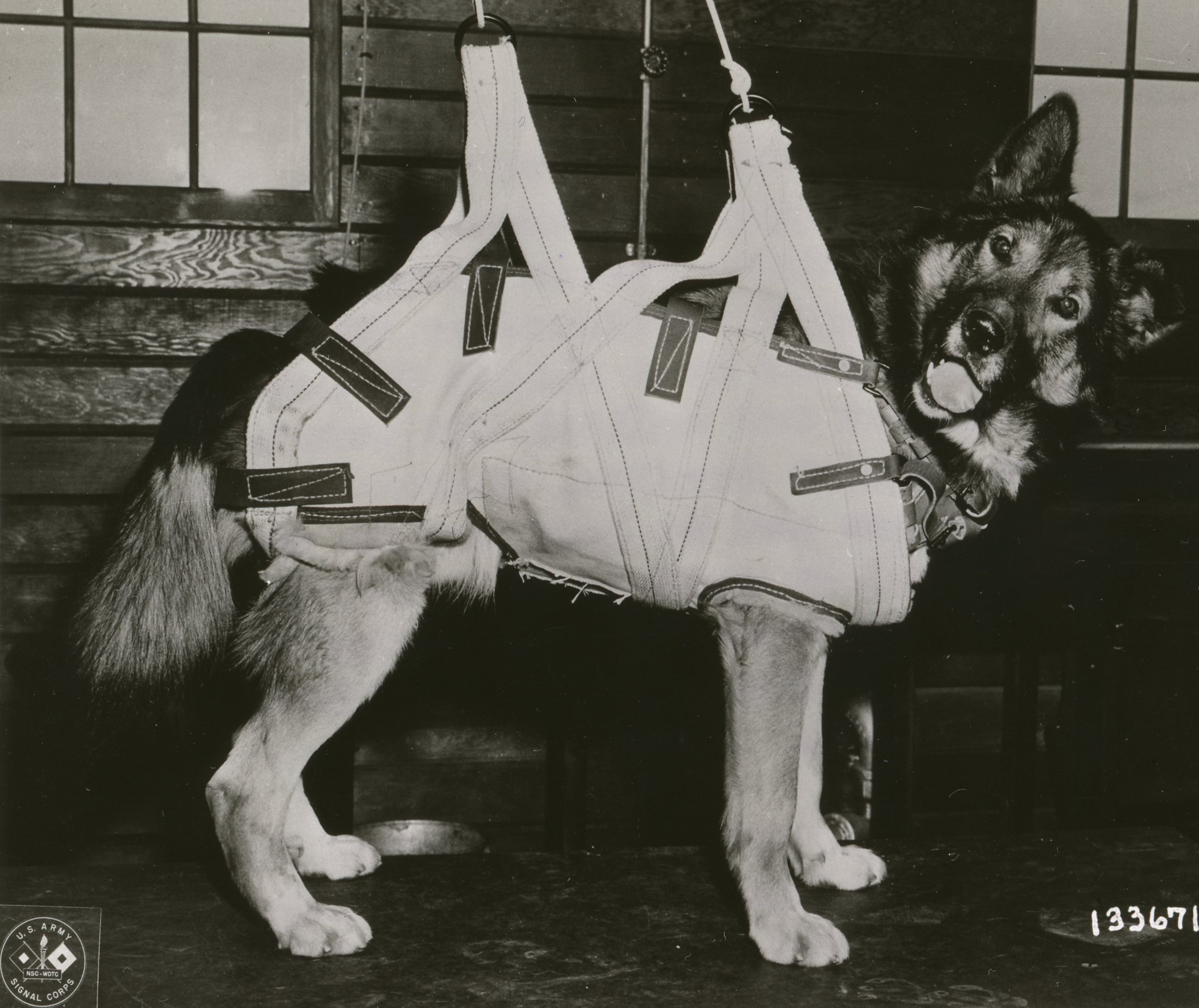
"Pal", a German Shepherd, being fitted for a parachute harness at the War Dog Reception and Training Center in San Carlos, California, 1944

Since early in the history of flight, non-human animals have been dropped from heights with the benefit of parachutes. Early on, animals were used as test subjects for parachutes and as entertainment. Following the development of the balloon, dogs, cats, fowl, and sheep were dropped from heights. During the 18th and 19th-century ballooning craze known as balloonomania, many aeronauts included parachuting animals such as monkeys in their demonstrations.

Later, animals were parachuted from airplanes, as test subjects, for amusement, and as a means of transporting working animals. During World War II, the many dogs parachuted from planes came to be known as "paradogs". Animal test subjects included a bear parachuted at supersonic speeds. Bat bombs, devised by the U.S. military, were designed to parachute a canister containing thousands of bomb-laden bats in Japan. Parachutes have also been used to transport animals, including mules and sheepdogs. In 1948, beaver drops in the United States parachuted beavers that were considered nuisances to remote locations.

Many animals were sent into space as test subjects and would return to Earth in capsules with parachutes.

== Early parachute tests and balloonomania ==
The development of the parachute in the 18th century followed the invention of the balloon. Some of the earliest tests of parachutes involved dogs, cats, and domesticated fowl. In a 19 September 1783 demonstration in Versailles observed by Marie Antoinette and Louis XVI, a duck, a rooster, and a sheep were carried by a Montgolfier brother balloon for eight minutes.

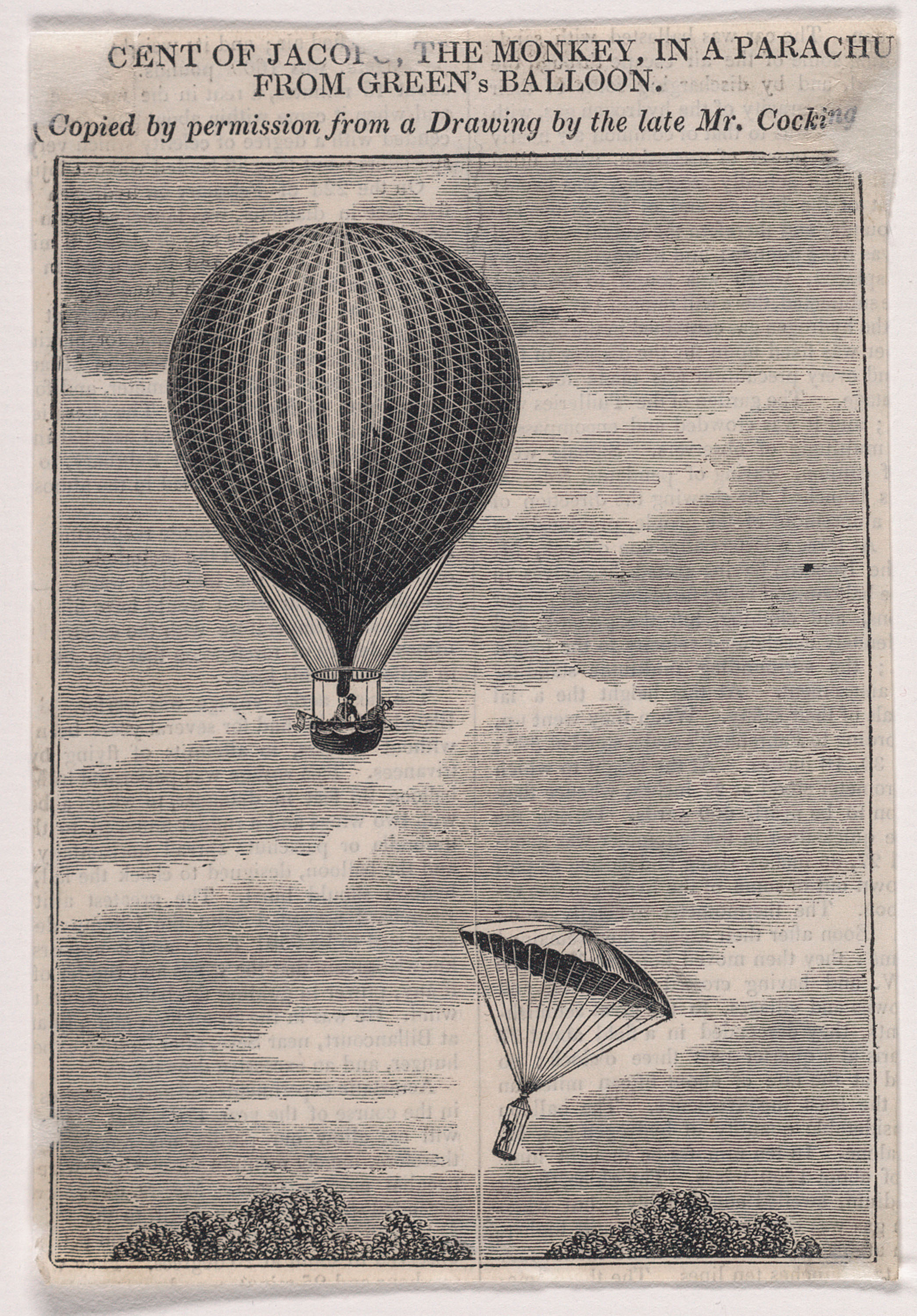
The descent of the monkey Jacopo from a balloon belonging to Charles Green, 1857

In the early 1780s, Louis-Sébastien Lenormand parachuted a cat and a dog from the top of Babotte Tower in Montpellier, France. In 1784, the Marquis de Brantes parachuted a sheep from the roof of the Palais des Papes in Avignon. Soon after, Joseph Montgolfier dropped animals from towers to test parachute-like devices.

During the balloon craze known as balloonomania in the late 18th and 19th centuries, balloonists, known then as aeronauts, began experimenting with parachuting animals.

=== Jean-Pierre Blanchard ===
The aeronaut Jean-Pierre Blanchard parachuted dozens of animals from balloons during his career. On 3 June 1785, he made a successful test of a parachute using a dog. Blanchard later dropped a cat and more dogs from parachutes. His attempt to drop a sheep with a parachute was unsuccessful. Later that year, a Mr Durry in Ireland repeated the feat, with a dog "suspended over the side of the gondola, wearing nothing but a parachute, and dropped".

Blanchard took a 5.5 kg (12 lb) cat up in his balloon. He placed the cat in a net connected by a long cord to a parachute and then slowly lowered the parachute from the gondola until it opened up. The cat descended to the ground. Blanchard also dropped a dog attached to a large chute, twice, over Lille. The second time was witnessed by Prince de Robecq and the "dog received no hurt" according to an article in Gentleman's Magazine. In 1788, Blanchard made a demonstration for Frederick the Great, placing a bird and a cat in a basket that was attached to the parachute. The animals lived.

The Cat, who was very unquiet in the state of slavery, appeared to have forgot its voracious nature, having spared the companion of its voyage; and the Bird appeared to have grown bold by the circumstance, and kept perched on the back of its enemy.

On 5 June 1793, Blanchard parachuted a dog, a cat, and a squirrel in Philadelphia. The animals were placed in a basket that was tethered to his balloon. A slow-burning fuse was set that released the basket while the balloon was mid-air, dropping the animals on the ground near Bush Hill. Blanchard repeated the demonstration on 17 and 21 June. A writer for the City Gazette in South Carolina claimed that Blanchard had thrown over 60 animals "from the height of the clouds" that had parachuted to safety. Blanchard's wife Sophie also parachuted dogs from her balloon. In 1789, Blanchard demonstrated a parachuting dog for the Polish king Stanisław August Poniatowski.

=== 19th century ===
In April 1835, a dog was parachuted from the roof of a theatre in Cincinnati, Ohio. That same year, balloonist Charles Green parachuted a monkey from the Surrey Zoological Gardens named Jacopo from his balloon as he was over Walworth. Jacopo would later return to the air with Margaret Graham two years later.

Balloon-parachute acts were popular in the mid to late 19th century and sometimes included animals. In 1886, the aeronaut Emil Leandro Melville in San Francisco repeatedly parachuted a small arboreal monkey from his balloon. Meanwhile, Maud DeHaven and Richard P. Hill had parachuting dogs. The exploits of parachuting balloonist Thomas Scott Baldwin were replicated in 1889 by a rhesus macaque known as "the Monkey Baldwin" at English music halls. Twice a day the monkey would parachute from the roof of the Royal Aquarium in Westminster. His handler Mademoiselle Eichlerette reported training three "Monkey Baldwins" and toured India and the United States for six years with her act. In 1893, aeronaut Jennie Leland had a parachuting dog named "Rollo" as part of her act.

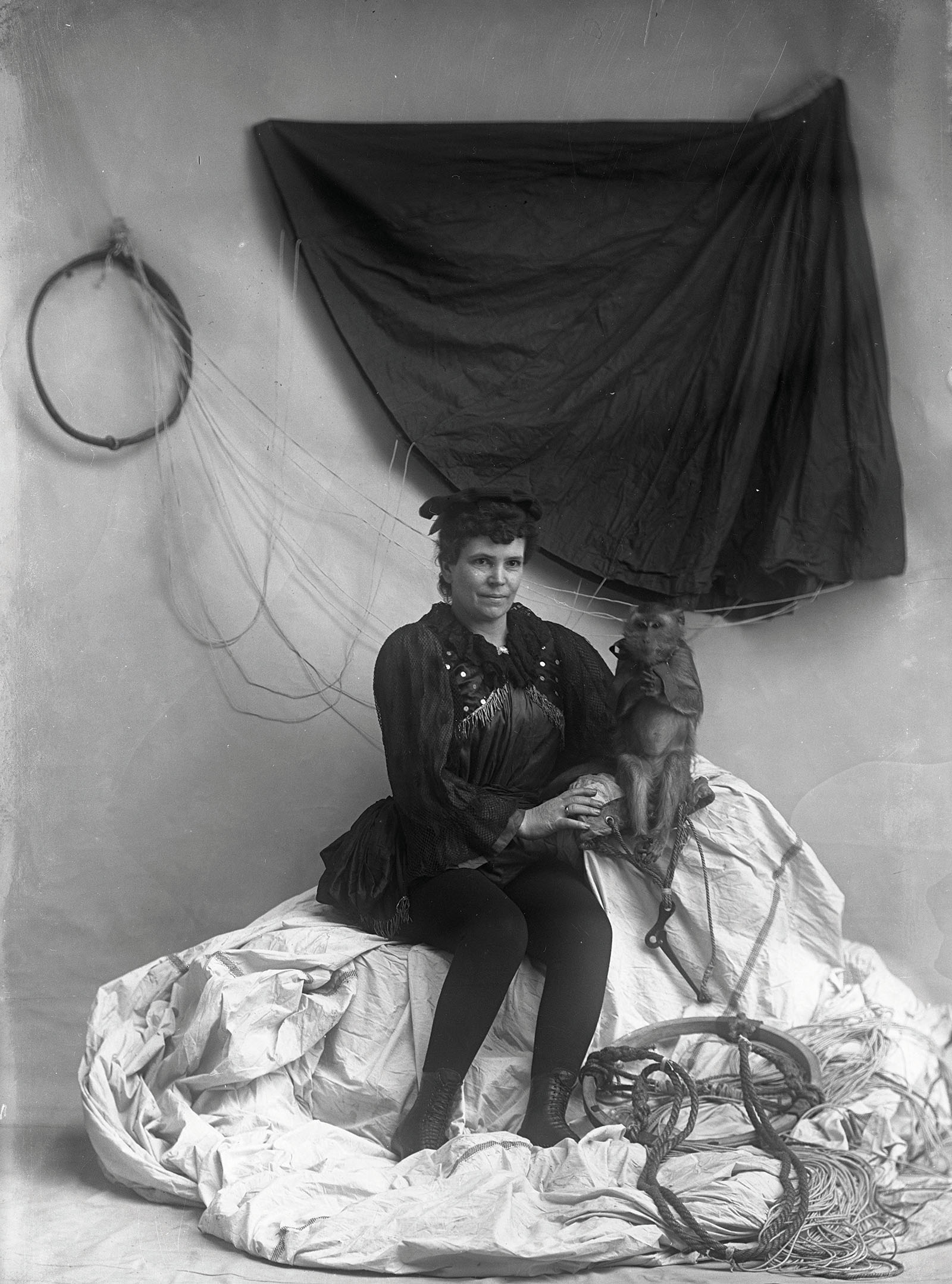
Aeronaut Hazel Keyes and her parachuting monkey Jennie Yan-Yan, c. 1892–1893

The American aeronaut Hazel Keyes had a monkey named "Miss Jennie Yan-Yan" who was one of the most famous parachuting monkeys. Keyes toured the U.S. west coast in the 1890s with Jennie Yan-Yan, who had her own miniature parachute. While Keyes suffered injuries during several of her exhibitions, Jennie Yan-Yan was seemingly never harmed. During an exhibition in Austin, Texas, Keyes and Jennie were suspended 300 m (1,000 ft) over Lake Austin. While Keyes failed to reach the powerhouse of the Austin Dam, Jennie jumped from her shoulder with a miniature parachute and descended to the waters below. William Kalt, who wrote a book about Keyes, said:

"I don't mean to laugh, but so many of those news reports are similar, and they almost always end by mentioning that the monkey was not harmed. She would have these horrific accidents, where everyone nearly died, yet she kept getting right back up in that balloon!"

A trained bonnet macaque named Mrs. Murphy made at least 150 parachute jumps during her tour of Europe and the United States in 1899 and 1900. She was purchased by her handler in India when she was two years old. She would hold her hands together and "pray" prior to her ascent in the balloon and then parachute solo from heights of around 300 m (1,000 ft).

=== 20th century ===
Parachuting animals continued to draw crowds in the 20th century. The parachuting monkey Bimbo made a series of balloon ascensions around Montana. On 16 August 1906, at the Columbia Gardens amusement park, mid-way through his parachute descent before a crowd of thousands, he fell. He had apparently gnawed through the ropes tying him to the parachute, fell around 300 m (1,000 ft), and was "crushed to a shapeless pulp on the roof of the pavilion". In 1912, a chimpanzee named Topsy performed around the United States in a balloon-parachute act. Air shows with stunt flyers also featured parachuting animals. Harold "Daredevil" Lockwood, for one, had a parachuting dog in 1928.

Despite growing concerns for animal welfare in parachute acts, few performances were stopped. Nonetheless, the use of animals in daredevil acts became increasingly rare in the 20th century. In 1929, two planned parachute drops of monkeys at Roosevelt Field in Long Island were cancelled. The first, by Charles de Bevere and his monkey "Jumpy" was stopped by clubwomen from Garden City. A second drop, by parachutist Saul Debever and his monkey, was halted under threat of prosecution by the Society for the Prevention of Cruelty to Animals.

== Military parachuting animals ==
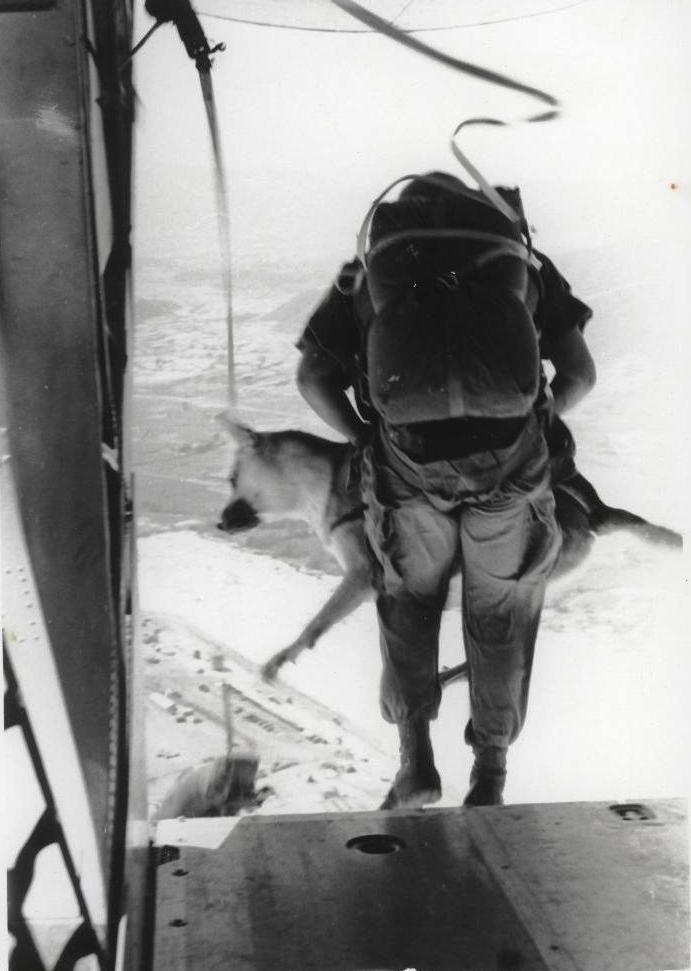
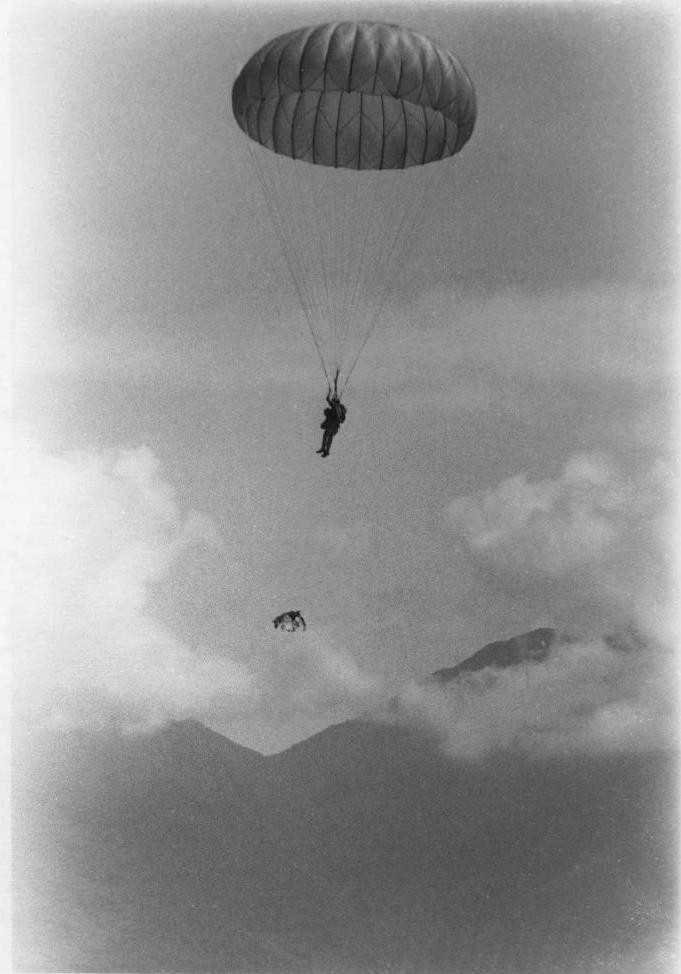
Lobo, a war dog, preparing to exit a plane and descending with his handler in Vietnam.

Animals have long been used in the military as working animals, mascots, and test subjects. As airplane and parachute technology advanced in the 20th century, there was an increasing incidence of parachuting animals, particularly dogs.

=== Paradogs ===
Parachuting dogs, sometimes referred to as "paradogs", have been frequently employed by militaries.

In the early 1920s, a dog named Jeff made multiple successful jumps with the Colorado Air National Guard. In his final jump in August 1924, Jeff's chute did not open. Later in 1935, an article in Popular Science featured a successful Soviet experimental parachute for a locked coop for dogs that sprang open when it hit the ground.

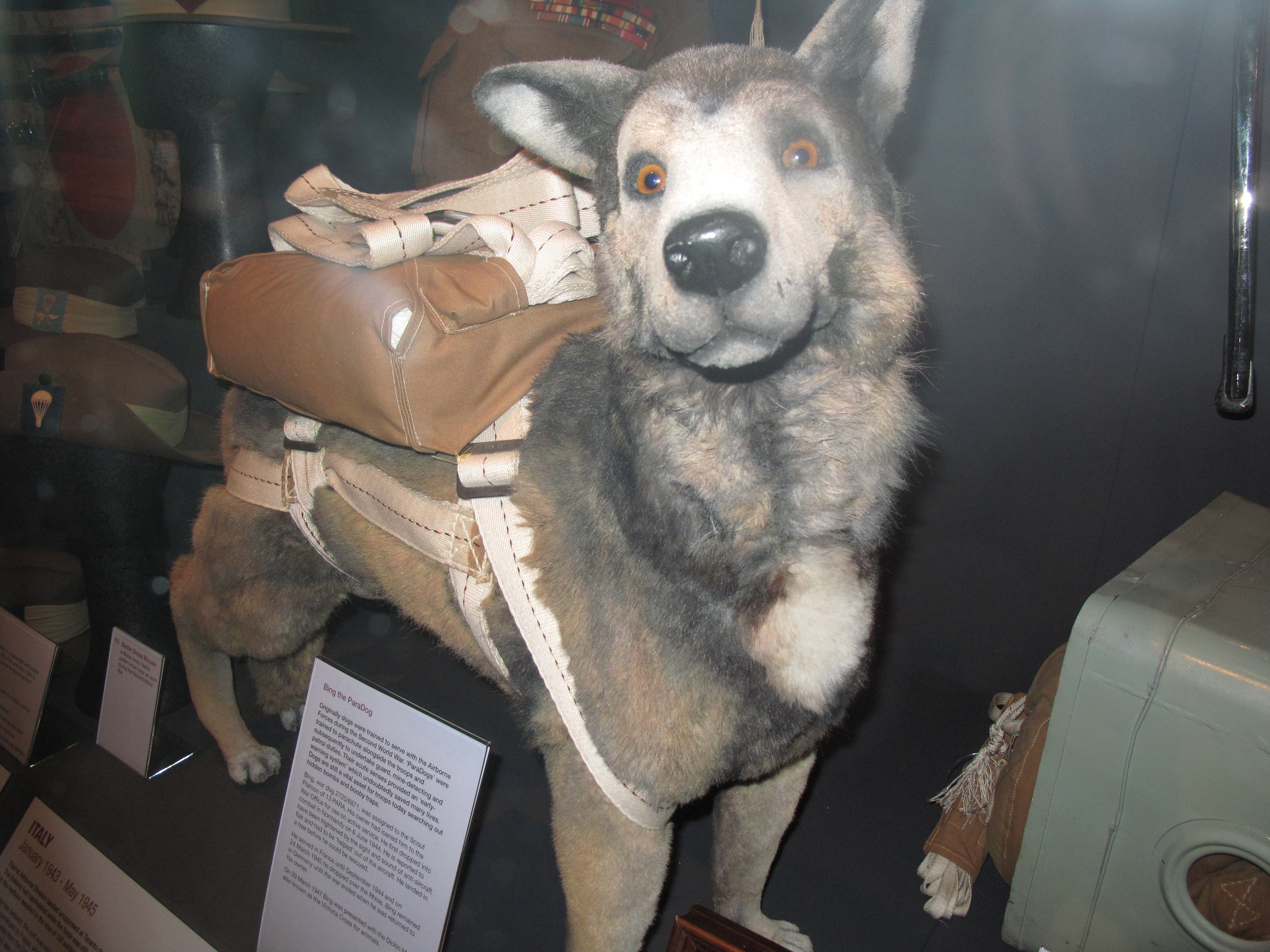
Museum replica of the paradog Bing

During World War II, the British 13th Parachute Battalion recruited dogs. The dogs served as mascots but were also trained to detect mines and serve as guard dogs. The Collie-German Shepherd mix breed dog Bing parachuted into Normandy on D-Day, though he had to be thrown out of the plane. He landed in a tree but survived and later parachuted into western Germany in March 1945 as part of Operation Varsity. Bing was awarded a Dickin Medal. Two other German Shepherds with the battalion, Ranee and Monty, also served as paradogs.

Smoky, a famous Yorkshire Terrier in World War II, was parachuted from trees at heights of 9 m (30 ft). She was parachuted as a stunt by her handler Bill Wynne and won the Best Mascot of the Southwest Pacific Area award. Rob, a Collie, was alleged to have made over 20 parachute descents during the North African campaign of World War II, serving with the SAS, and was awarded a Dickin Medal. In 2006, his jumps were revealed as a possible hoax perpetrated by members of his regiment to prevent the dog from returning to his original owners.

Some paradogs were killed in action. A Doberman with the 463rd Parachute Field Artillery and a German Shepherd named Jaint de Montmorency with the 506th Parachute Infantry Regiment, both of the US, dropped into France in 1944 and were killed in action.

The U.S. Army experimented with parachuting Siberian Huskies with water and K-rations to bring to stranded soldiers. The dogs were taken up in a transport plane and pushed out of the side door, sometimes two dogs per parachute, on a static line which would open after they cleared the door. In the 1950s, during Operation Deep Freeze, a series of United States missions to Antarctica, working dogs were intended to be parachuted in.

Most modern parachuting dogs have specially designed harnesses and make tandem jumps with their handlers.

=== Bat bombs ===
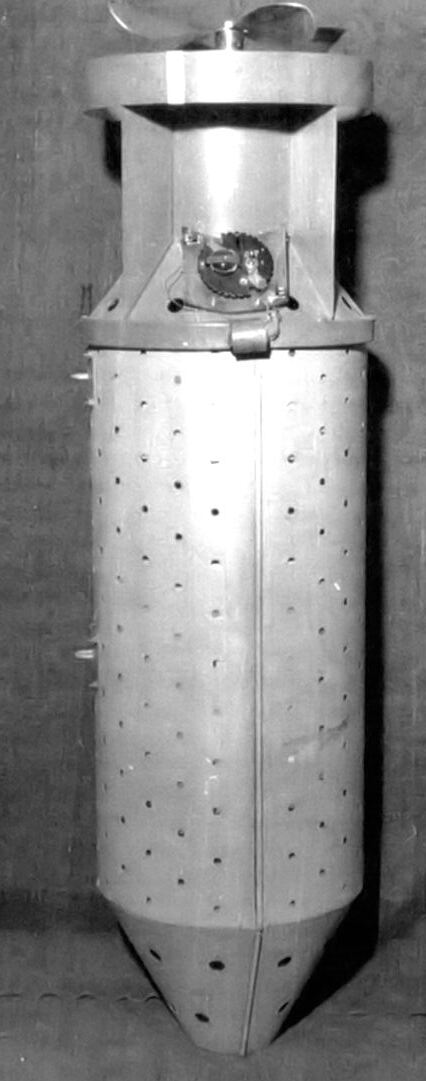
Bat bomb canister used to hold the hibernating bats

During World War II, the United States military developed an experimental weapon known as a bat bomb. The device consisted of a bomb-shaped casing with over a thousand compartments, each containing a hibernating Mexican free-tailed bat with a small, timed incendiary bomb attached. Dropped from a bomber at dawn, the casings would deploy a parachute mid-flight and open to release the bats, which would then disperse and roost in eaves and attics in a 32–64 km radius (20–40 mi). The incendiaries, which were set on timers, would then ignite and start fires in inaccessible places in the largely wood and paper constructions of the Japanese cities that were the weapon's intended target.

=== Parachuting mules ===
Attempts were made by the U.S. Army in 1942 to parachute mules. In one attempt, a dozen mules were taken up in an airplane. Six of them could not be pushed out of the airplane, while another six were dropped in slings attached to parachutes. Unfortunately, the jerk from the opening of the chutes severed the mules' mesenteric arteries, killing them. During the Burma Campaign, mules were flown in to the Chindits, long-range penetration forces on the ground. Lt. Col. K. I. Barlow suggested parachuting the animals and arranged trial drops at the Air Transport Development Centre in Chaklala, Punjab. An elderly, sedated mule was placed at the centre of nylon bladder pontoons that were fastened to a platform. Two triple clusters of 8.5 m (30 ft) statichutes were used and the mule was dropped from 180 m (600 ft), landing at 4.5 m/s (15 ft/s). After the successful test, mules were transported via the Chabua 44th Air Depot from Assam, India.

It was hard to know who kicked harder. The mules slipped and slid on an aluminum floor, protesting every shove toward the portside drop. The Americans dropped their mules from a height of 2000 to 3000 feet. Three large 'chutes per mule were not enough to guarantee a happy landing. Those that didn't make it became fresh rations.

Later in 1945, the British successfully devised crates with airbags for 400 kg (900 lb) mules that were dropped by parachute from C-47s. The U.S. Army experimented again with parachuting a mule in 1946. A sedated mule was strapped to a padded pallet and dropped from a C-47 by a static line at a height of 7.6 km (4.7 mi).

=== Other parachuting animals ===
Jacksonia, a monkey captured from the island of Luzon, made two jumps by parachute in Japan during World War II with a sergeant from the 11th Airborne Division. Boudgie, an African parachuting monkey, received a North Africa campaign ribbon and was credited with saving the life of her handler four times. During the Vietnam War, the 173rd Airborne Brigade had a "parachuting primate", Pfc. Bufford L. Monkey, who joined troops on parachute jumps.

The Asian black bear Rocky was born in 1953 and purchased from a Kumamoto zoo to serve as a mascot for the U.S. 187th Airborne Regimental Combat Team during the Korean War. She completed five parachute jumps, earning her parachutist badge. After sustaining injuries during an artillery attack, she was awarded a Purple Heart.

During the Vietnam War, supply drops made to isolated outposts could include livestock such as chickens, ducks, pigs, and cows. Except for the cows, the animals were placed in bamboo wicker baskets and dropped by parachute from heights of 75–90 m (250–300 ft).

== Equipment and skydiving ==
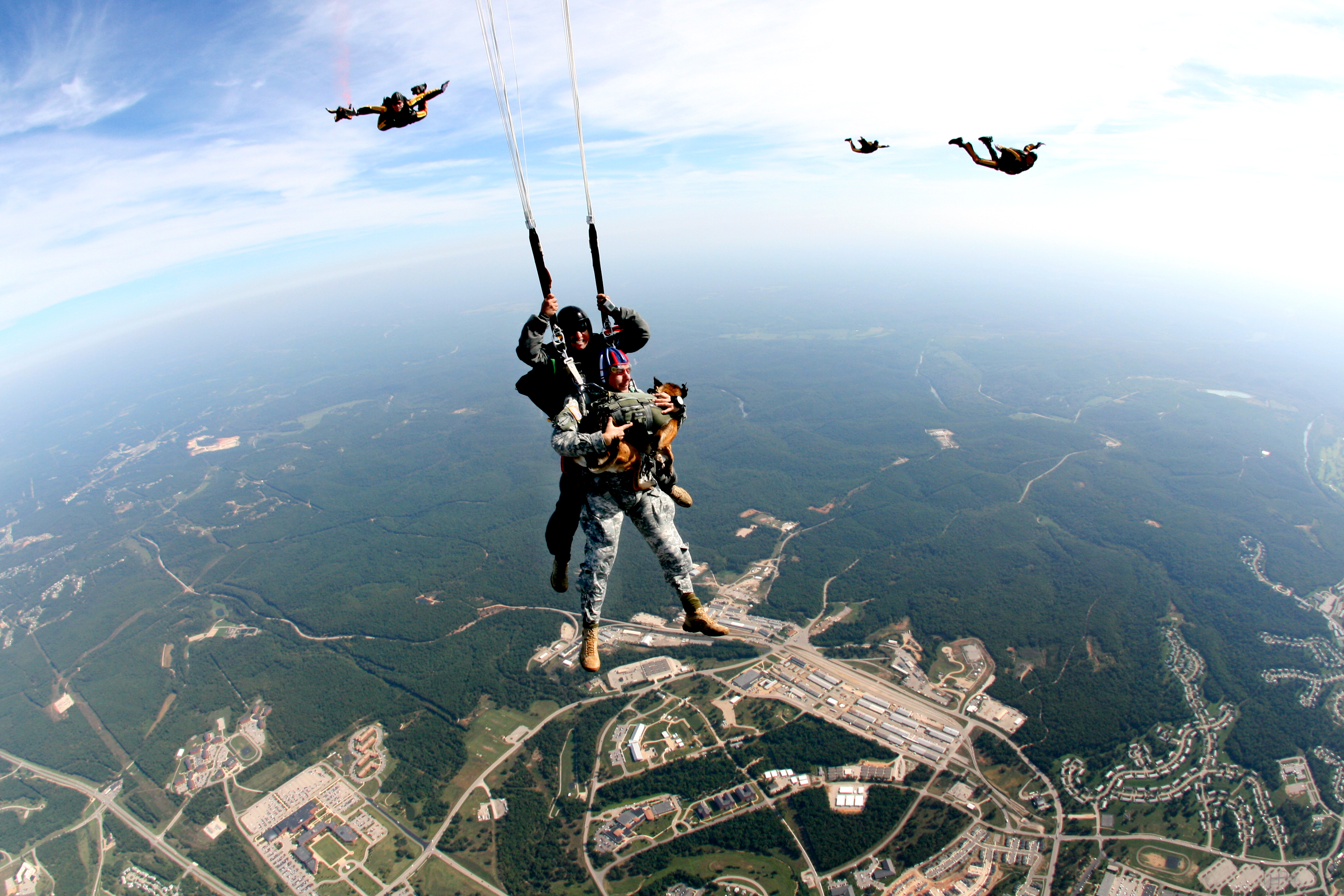
Military dog performing a tandem jump

Specialized harnesses and other equipment for parachuting animals have developed over time. Tandem jumps have become the predominant method. Other equipment such as goggles for dogs (doggles) have been designed. The U.S. Special Operations Command's innovation cell hosted a competition to design oxygen masks for dogs in 2017. Humans have also taken dogs and other animals skydiving. Mike Forsythe and his dog Cara set a record for the highest tandem dog-human parachute deployment in 2011, making their descent from 9.2 km (30,000 ft).

== As test subjects ==
Alongside advancements in human flight and parachute technology, animals have served as test subjects. Initial tests of parachutes were often conducted with animals. Later, animals were parachuted from airplanes and rockets.

During World War II, Major, a 145 lb (66 kg) St. Bernard, was fitted with a custom oxygen mask before being dropped from a plane at 26,000 ft (7,900 m). Witnesses to the test, which was to determine the impact of high altitudes on parachute straps, reported seeing Major dogpaddling during his descent.

The rhesus macaque Albert I was launched in a V-2 Rocket on 18 June 1948. The respiratory apparatus and the parachute system both failed, and Albert likely died due to breathing problems but would have died on impact anyway since the capsule's parachute failed to open. Another rhesus macaque, Albert II became the first mammal in space on 14 June 1949, but plummeted to his death after a parachute failure.

At Edwards Air Force Base in 1962, bears were used for a series of escape capsule ejection tests of the Convair B-58 Hustler. The first supersonic ejection test occurred on 21 March 1962 at the speed of Mach 1.3 at 35,000 ft (11,000 m) and the bear survived the nearly eight-minute parachute descent. A bear was ejected again from a height of 45,000 ft (14,000 m) on 6 April. After examination, it was determined that the bear had received minor hemorrhage of the neck muscles from whiplash and two pelvic bone fractures. On 8 June, a chimpanzee served as the test subject for the escape capsule and parachuted to the ground unharmed. Bears were sent up for subsequent tests, with one sent up on 27 July reported to have suffered "internal injuries of some severity".

In July 1962, four hamsters, two rhesus monkeys, and several flower beetles were sent in a 39-hour, 3,000 km (2,000 mi) high-altitude balloon trip from Goose Bay, Labrador, as part of an experiment by NASA's Ames Research Center to test the effects of radiation. Following the parachute descent of the capsules, it was discovered that the monkeys and hamsters had died due to a life support system failure.

During the development of spaceflight, many animals were sent into space as test subjects and would return to Earth in capsules with parachutes.

== Animal drops ==
=== Beaver drop ===
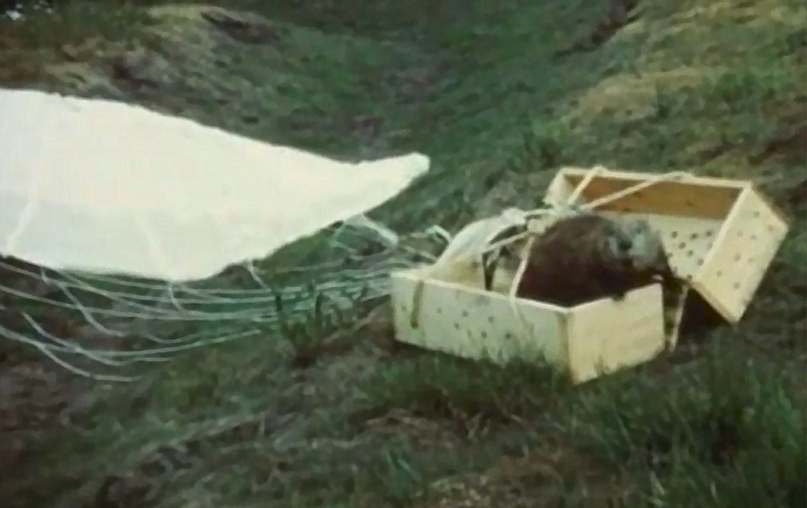
Beaver drop box sprung open after landing in Idaho, 1950

In 1948, the Idaho Department of Fish and Game devised a program to relocate beavers from Northwestern Idaho to the Chamberlain Basin in Central Idaho. The beaver drop program was started to address complaints about property damage from residents and involved flying 76 beavers by airplane and parachuting them down to the ground. Parachuting the beavers proved to be more cost-effective than alternative methods of relocation and also decreased beaver mortality rates. An older beaver named "Geronimo" was a test subject for the boxes, repeatedly parachuting to the ground. The Idaho Fish and Game Department produced a 14-minute film about the relocation and the program was written up in an April 1950 article in the Journal of Wildlife Management titled "Transplanting Beavers by Airplane and Parachute".

=== Sheepdog drop ===
In 1949, shepherds in Carbon County, Utah, had a shortage of sheepdogs to protect their flocks, many of them having been poisoned by coyote bait. Due to snow, the marooned flocks were inaccessible by land, so the Civil Air Patrol arranged for a "doglift" where sheepdogs were parachuted in. Parachutes were provided by the state Aeronautics Commission and a special harness for the paradogs was designed by E. L. Davis.

=== Operation Cat Drop ===
The United Kingdom's Royal Air Force delivered cats, equipment and supplies to remote regions of the then-British colony of Sarawak (today part of Malaysia), on the island of Borneo in 1960. The cats were flown out of Singapore and delivered in crates dropped by parachutes as part of a broader program of supplying cats to combat an infestation of rats. The operation, known as Operation Cat Drop, was reported as a success at the time. Newspaper reports published soon after the Operation reference only 23 cats being used. However, some later accounts of the event claim as many as 14,000 cats were used. An additional source references a "recruitment" drive for 30 cats a few days before Operation Cat Drop.

=== Anti-poaching dogs ===
In 2016, the South African defense contractor Paramount Group established the Anti-Poaching and Canine Training Academy. Belgian Malinois and German Shepherds trained at the facility are parachuted from helicopters to assist in tracking elephant poachers.

=== Fish ===
The Utah Division of Wildlife Resources has dropped fish from aircraft to re-stock high altitude lakes since at least 1956. This is done to repopulate the lakes with fish for recreational anglers given that the fish don't naturally reproduce in them. In 2021 the agency stated that it dropped as many as 35,000 fish during each flight, with a 95 percent survival rate. Flights are conducted each summer. The Division of Wildlife Resources states that restocking the lakes by air is cheaper than transporting the fish overland and less stressful for the animals.

== In fiction ==
Parachuting animals have been depicted in fiction numerous times. The 1945 Japanese film Momotaro: Sacred Sailors included a monkey, dog, and bear cub who become paratroopers. The 1995 film Operation Dumbo Drop concerns the delivery of an elephant by parachute during the Vietnam War. In the late 1990s, the artist Banksy produced a series of Parachuting Rat stencil art in Melbourne, depicting rats descending in parachutes. In the 1949 British film Passport to Pimlico, pigs are parachuted to the people of Pimlico.
