= Operation Cat Drop =

UK air drop of cats into Borneo to combat rats

Operation Cat Drop is the name given to the delivery of cats, equipment and supplies by the United Kingdom's Royal Air Force to remote regions of the then-British colony of Sarawak (today part of Malaysia), on the island of Borneo in 1960. The cats were flown out of Singapore and delivered in crates dropped by parachutes as part of a broader program of supplying cats to curb an infestation of rats. The operation was reported as a "success" at the time. Newspaper reports published soon after the operation reference only 23 cats being used. Some unreliable later accounts of the event claim that as many as 14,000 cats were used, but this figure is apocryphal. An additional source references a "recruitment" drive for 30 cats a few days prior to Operation Cat Drop.

== Background ==
Insecticides including dichlorodiphenyltrichloroethane (DDT) were widely used during the 1950s, including in Borneo, as a malaria control measure. The insecticides were intended to kill malaria-carrying mosquitoes before they could pass the disease onto humans.

At the time of the cat drop in 1960, newspaper reports indicate that a district in Sarawak was suffering from an infestation of rats, which were destroying crops. It has been suggested that this rat infestation was the result of many of the existing local cats dying due to the use of DDT or other insecticides, and the rat population subsequently increasing as it faced reduced predation from cats. While it has been claimed that these cat deaths resulted from biomagnification of DDT – the cats eating other creatures such as lizards or cockroaches that had in turn been exposed to DDT – this has not been confirmed. Deaths of cats may have been caused by direct exposure to DDT sprayed in dwellings, as opposed to biomagnification.

There have been reports of cat deaths due to DDT exposure in Thailand, Bolivia and Mexico, with a subsequent increase in rodent infestations reported in Thailand and Bolivia. In several of these cases, it has been proposed that the cat fatalities were the result of cats licking their fur after brushing up against a wall or other surface sprayed with DDT.

The native domestic cat population being reduced as an unintended consequence of the World Health Organization (WHO) spraying DDT for malaria control has been referenced as an example of the problems and solutions that may arise from human interventions in the environment, or of how unintended consequences lead to other events more generally, and particularly how frameworks such as systems thinking or "whole systems thinking" can more effectively forecast and avoid negative consequences.

== Ecological lessons learned ==
Operation Cat Drop underscored the complexity of ecosystems and the potential for unforeseen consequences when intervening in natural processes. The initial use of DDT to control mosquitoes disrupted multiple food chains, leading to cascading effects that necessitated further intervention. This event highlights the importance of adopting a systems thinking approach in environmental management, considering the interconnectedness of species and the potential ripple effects of human actions.

== Similar projects ==
There have been various other projects involving delivering animals by parachute. Video footage purporting to show an aerial beaver drop, intended to improve water quality, appeared in October 2015. The Utah Division of Wildlife Resources restocks its "high-elevation lakes and streams with tiny trout" dropped directly (no parachute) from an aircraft flying 30–45 m (100–150 ft) above the water.

== See also ==
- Parachuting animals
