= Beaver drop =

1948 American program to relocate beavers

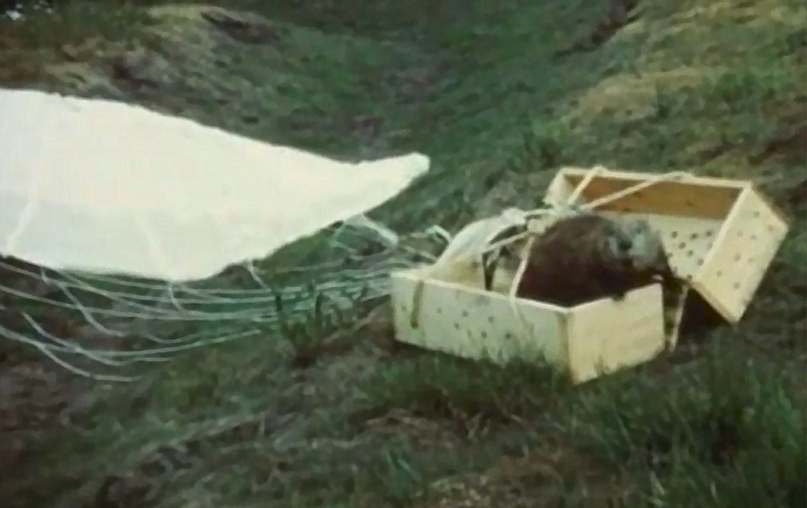
Beaver drop box sprung open on landing, Idaho, 1950.

The beaver drop was a 1948 Idaho Department of Fish and Game program to relocate beavers from Northwestern Idaho to the Chamberlain Basin in Central Idaho. The program involved moving 76 beavers by airplane and parachuting them down to the ground. The program was started to address complaints about property damage from residents. Parachuting beavers proved to be more cost-effective and it also decreased beaver mortality rates more than alternative methods of relocation.

== Background ==
After the end of World War II, many of Idaho's residents migrated from Idaho's cities to the state's rural areas in the southwest. As a result, the Idaho Department of Fish and Game received increased complaints about property damage from beavers cutting down trees and creating dams in the town.

Beavers were considered crucial to the health of Idaho's wetlands, as they helped to reduce erosion, improved water quality, and created habitats for birds and fish. Idaho's beaver population, however, had reached low levels after overhunting for the fur trade. In order to reintroduce beavers, the United States Department of the Interior had already been relocating beavers to the state since 1936. The program was massively successful, as the estimated cost of relocating a beaver to Idaho was $8 (equivalent to $190 in 2025) and the estimated value of a beaver's work over its lifespan was US$300 (equivalent to $6900 in 2025). Instead of exterminating the beavers, the department decided to relocate 76 beavers to the Chamberlain Basin area of the Sawtooth Mountain Range in central Idaho.

However, transporting beavers on land, as done since the 1930s, was "arduous, prolonged, expensive, and resulted in high mortality." Trappers would first trap beavers, load them on a truck, and deliver them to a conservation officer. Then, the beavers would be loaded on trucks again, then strapped onto a horse or mule to be sent over the more mountainous areas. This process resulted in the beavers overheating in the sun, and become stressed to the point of not eating.

== Parachuting ==
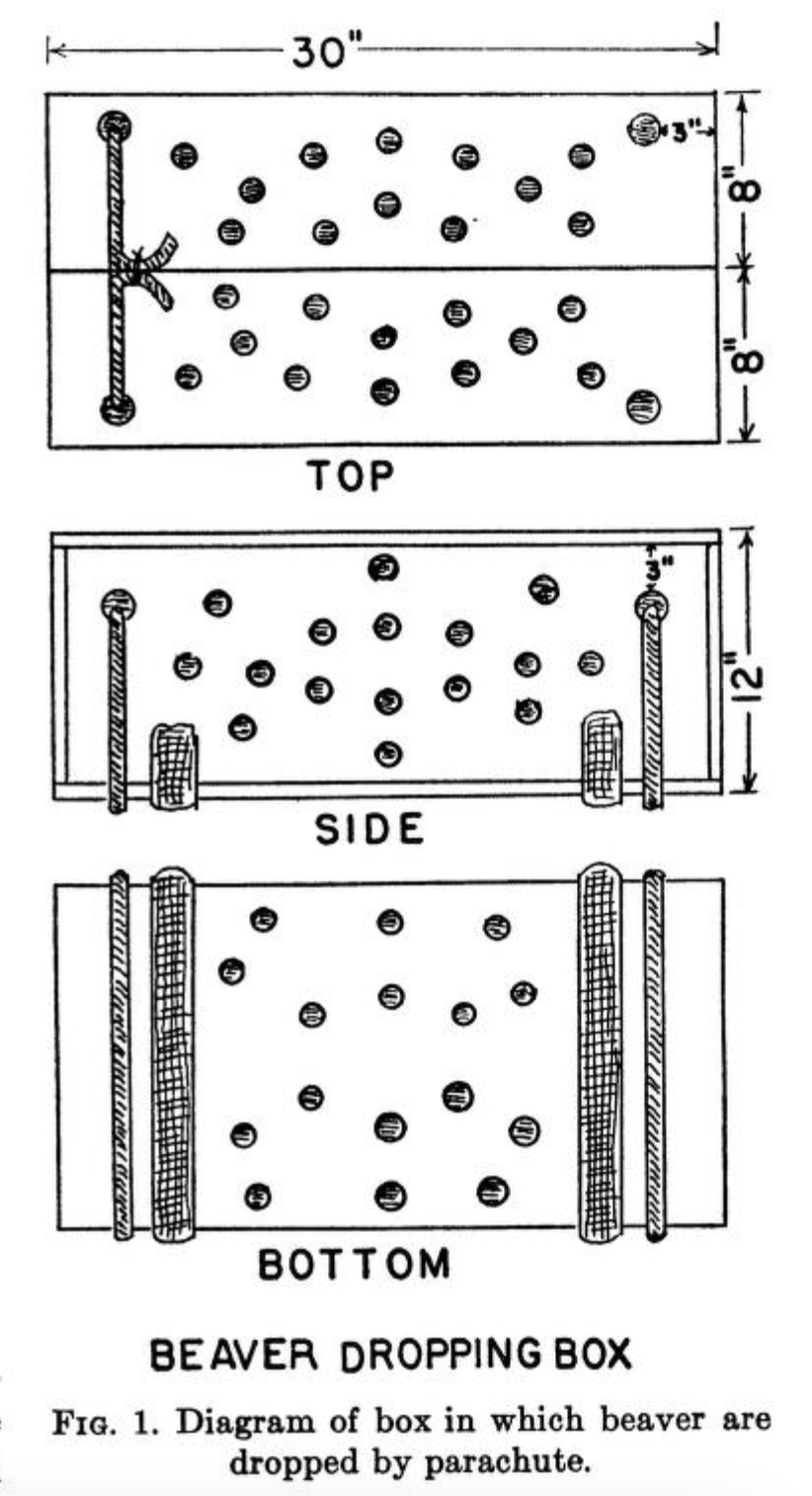
Diagram of a beaver dropping box

The goal was to move beavers from the town of McCall and regions around Payette Lake in west central Idaho, to the Chamberlain Basin in central Idaho. One Idaho Department of Fish and Game employee named Elmo W. Heter came up with an idea to fly beavers to the area and parachute them safely to the ground using leftover WWII parachutes and lidless wooden boxes.

Two boxes with breathing holes were fitted together like a suitcase and hinged. Heavy 2 in (5.1 cm) elastic bands were fastened to the bottom of the box and extended 3 in (7.6 cm) up the sides of the box; they formed double springs which would snap open the box upon landing. The boxes were launched between 500 ft (150 m) and 800 ft (240 m). Ropes held the boxes together until the box landed and the box automatically opened. The design was tested with a beaver nicknamed Geronimo. Two beavers were put in each 30 in × 12 in × 8 in (76 cm × 30 cm × 20 cm) box.

Conservation officers consulted with the Idaho State Fur Supervisor and carefully selected sites to receive beavers. From their previous experience, they learned that younger beavers were easier to relocate successfully. They found it was best to relocate groups of four beavers: one male and three females.

On August 14, 1948, a twin-engine Beechcraft took off with eight crates of beavers, a pilot and a conservation officer. In the following days, 76 beavers were parachuted into meadows, 75 of which survived. The only casualty of the operation was a beaver that forced its way out of the box while parachuting, then fell to its death. A 2014 article about California's program to relocate beavers from farm areas to mountain areas stated that they began relocating beavers in 1923. The article referred to the Idaho Beaver relocation program as extreme.

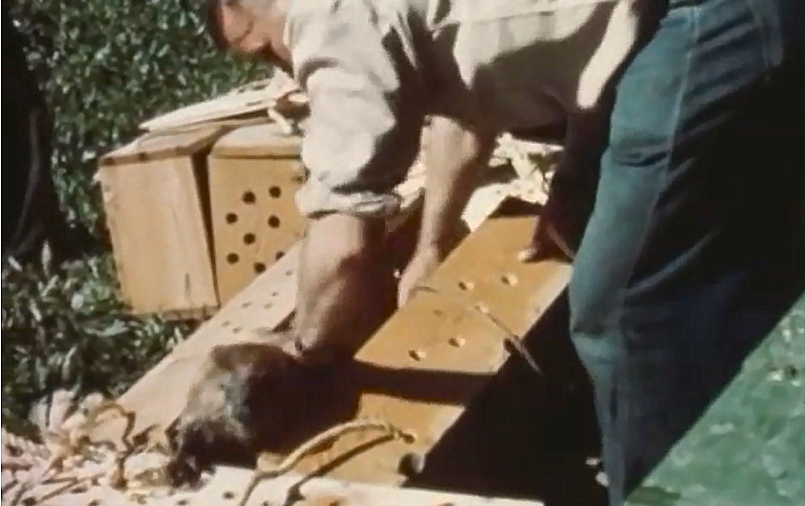
Packing a beaver into a drop box Idaho 1950

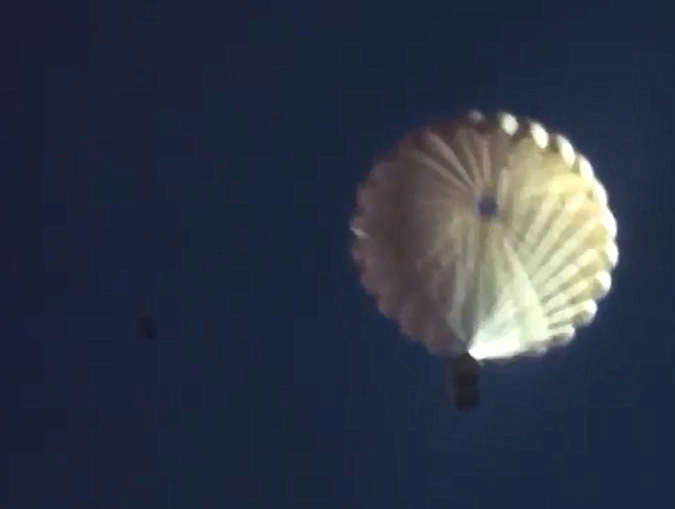
Beaver drop box parachuting to land Idaho 1950

== Legacy ==
The beaver drop is remembered as both ingenious and bizarre. In 1949, the operation was deemed successful after officials observed the beavers had made homes in the new areas. Also in 1949, Popular Mechanics magazine published an article about the parachuting beavers, calling the beavers "Parabeavers". Parachuting proved to be more cost-effective, and it had a lower mortality rate than other methods of relocation.

In 2015, fish and game historian Sharon Clark discovered the film of the beaver drops, and the Idaho State Historical Society uploaded the video to YouTube. The film had been mishandled and misclassified, so it was digitized. Time magazine claimed that the uploaded video made beavers, "the Internet's latest favorite animal". In 2022, the New Colony Beer Company of Boise Idaho changed their logo to a parachuting beaver to commemorate the quirky beaver relocation project. In 2023, the East Idaho News said, "The endeavor became an Idaho icon, with locally made clothing bearing a parachuting beaver logo, a children’s book detailing the beavers’ journey and even a Boise brewery adopting the image".

In 2015, Steve Nadeau, the Idaho state fur bearer manager for Fish and Game, said the state still traps and relocates beavers. He said it has been 50 years since the state relocated beavers by air. Idaho Fish and Game's Steve Liebenthal said he does not know why the project was discontinued. He said, "my assumption is that they accomplished what they wanted to accomplish in the area and there was no need to continue".

In 2025, the Boise Hawks baseball team of the independent Pioneer League announced that they would be temporarily rebranding themselves as the "Boise Battle Beavers" in commemoration of the beaver drops.

== See also ==
- Beaver eradication in Tierra del Fuego
- Operation Cat Drop
- Parachuting animals
