= John Jeffries II =

American ophthalmic surgeon

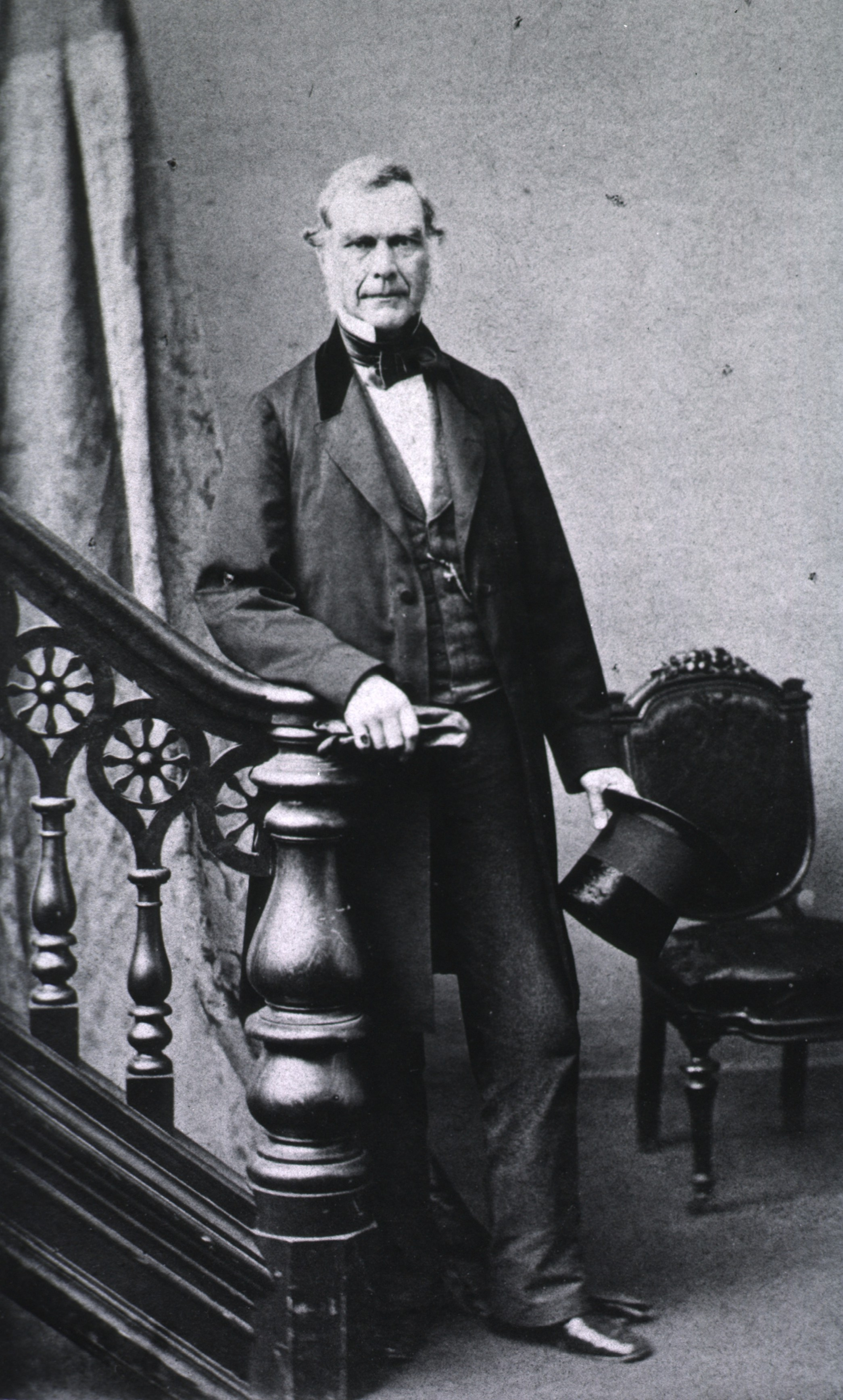
- Jeffries in 1865
- Born: March 23, 1796; Boston Massachusetts
- Occupation: ophthalmic surgeon
- Known for: Massachusetts Eye and Ear

John Jeffries II (March 23, 1796– July 1876) was an American ophthalmic surgeon who co-founded the Massachusetts Charitable Eye and Ear Infirmary in 1824 with Edward Reynolds. This organization, which began life as the Boston Eye Infirmary, became officially incorporated in 1826 and maintained that name until 1924 when it became Massachusetts Eye and Ear. Jeffries and Reynolds were the only surgical staff until 1833 when the staff was expanded to include other assistant surgeons as well as an apothecary. Jeffries resigned from this position in 1842 and had no other official interaction with the institution until his son Benjamin was named Surgeon of the Infirmary in 1867.

== Early life and education ==
Jeffries was born in Boston. His father was the physician and meteorologist John Jeffries. He attended Harvard College at 15 and graduated in the class of 1815. He received a Doctor of Medicine degree from Harvard in 1819 and became a fellow of the Massachusetts Medical Society in 1826. He married in 1820, and was the father of three daughters and five sons, one of whom was Benjamin Joy Jeffries, one of the creators of the New England Ophthalmological Society. The family had a summer residence in East Boston in a neighborhood now known as Jeffries Point.
