= Canal Mania =

18th century period of speculative canal building in the United Kingdom

Canal Mania was the period of intense canal building in England and Wales between the 1790s and 1810s, and the speculative frenzy that ensued in the early 1790s.

== Background ==
The earliest canal building was undertaken as a local enterprise, usually by a merchant, manufacturer or mine owner needing to ship goods, such as the Bridgewater Canal, built by the Duke of Bridgewater to ship his coal from Worsley to Manchester.

Despite the high cost of construction, the price of coal in Manchester fell by 50% shortly after it opened, and the financial success was attractive to investors.

The expensive American War of Independence ended in 1783. A long run of good harvests resulted in an increase in disposable income and an increase in the number of people looking to invest capital for a profit with little personal interest in the business.

There was a dramatic rise in the number of schemes promoted. Only one new canal was authorised by an act of Parliament in 1790 (the Glamorganshire Canal), but by 1793 there were twenty new canals authorised (the Warwick and Birmingham Canal, the Grand Junction Canal, the Ellesmere and Chester Canal, the Chelmer and Blackwater Navigation, the Grantham Canal, the Aberdare Canal, the Brecknock and Abergavenny Canal, the Gloucester and Berkeley Canal, the Leicestershire and Northamptonshire Union Canal, the Derby Canal, the Oakham Canal, the Crinan Canal, the Ulverstone Canal, the Barnsley Canal, the Nutbrook Canal, the Stratford-upon-Avon Canal, the Shrewsbury Canal, the Caistor Canal, the Dearne and Dove Canal, and the Stainforth and Keadby Canal).

The capital the Glamorganshire Canal Company was authorised to raise in 1790 was £90,000 (£8.49 million in 2015), but the combined authorised for the new canals in 1793 had risen to £2,824,700 (£256 million in 2015) by 1793.

Some of the canals authorized during this period went on to be profitable. However, there were a number, including the Herefordshire and Gloucestershire Canal, which never paid a dividend. Others, such as the Grand Western Canal, were never completed.

== See also ==
- History of the British canal system
- Canals of the United Kingdom
- Balloonomania
- Railway Mania
- Bike boom
- Dot-com bubble
- List of canals in the United Kingdom
- Timeline of transportation technology
