= Vladimir Moskovkin =

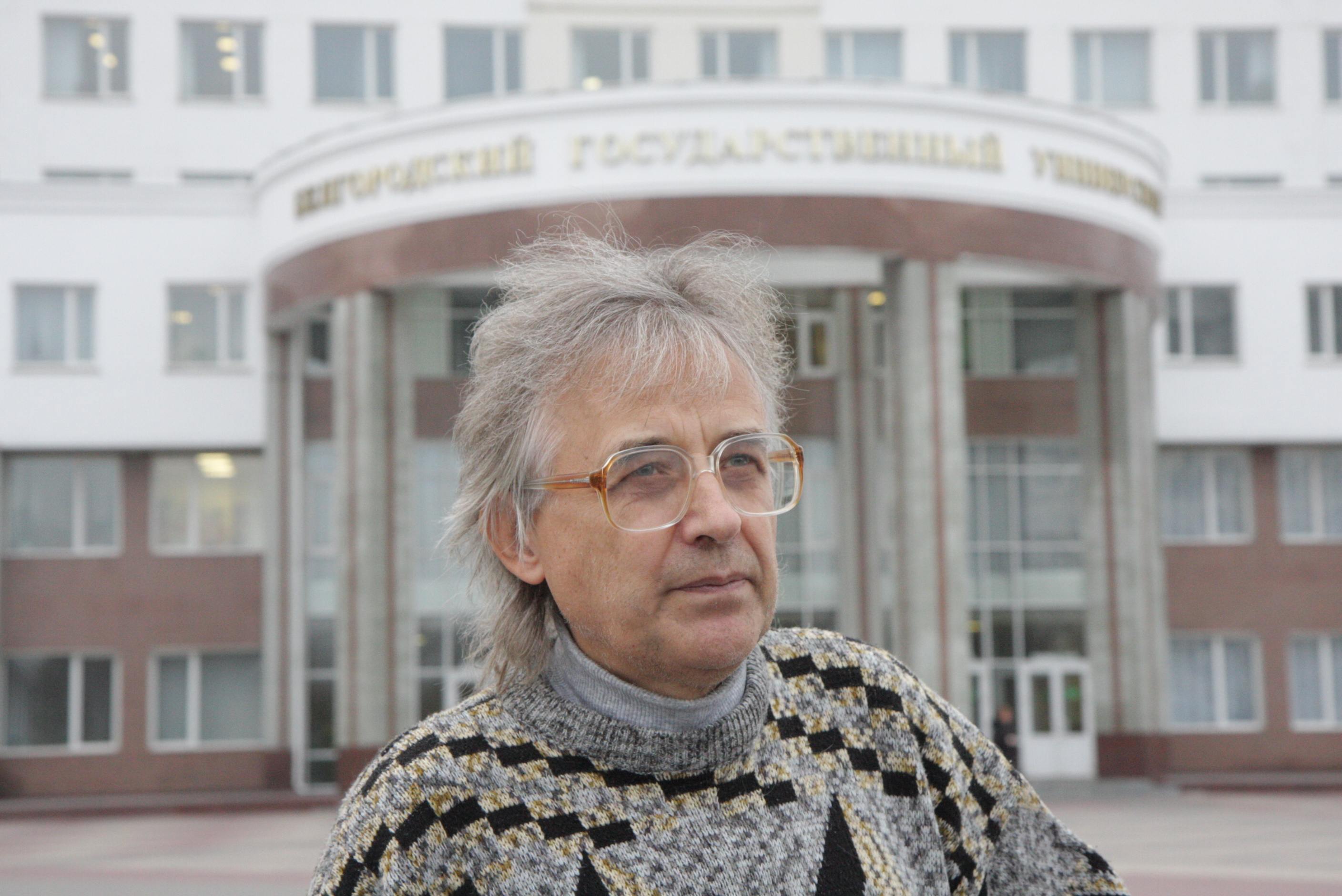
V. Moskovkin

Vladimir Mikhailovich Moskovkin (born 5 February 1952, Yalta, Crimea) is a Post-Soviet and Ukrainian geographer, economist, scientometrist, teacher, publicist. He has Doctor of Geographical Sciences and is a professor.

== Early life and education ==
In 1969 he finished Yalta Comprehensive School No. 6 and graduated from the Moscow State University Correspondence Mathematical School.

In 1975 he graduated from KSU (Kazan State University) Faculty of Mechanics and Mathematics.

== Career ==
In 1976 he held the position of an engineer in the Crimean Landslide Protection Office, Yalta.

In 1977 he held a Senior Laboratory Assistant position at the Soil and Climatic Research Department of the State Nikitsky Botanical Garden (Yalta).

From 1977 to 1978 he held a position of an engineer at the Soil Erosion Department of the Ukrainian Soils Science and Agricultural Chemistry Research Institute (Kharkov).

From 1978 to 1990 he held a Junior Researcher position, then a Senior Researcher position and then worked as a Head of the Yalta Department All-Union Water Conservation Research Institute at the State Committee of Nature Protection of the USSR (Kharkov).

From 1990 to 1992 he worked as a Head of the Yalta Department in the Sochi Research Centre “Recreation Territories Management and Tourism” at the USSR Academy of Sciences

In 1984 he became a Candidate of Geographical Sciences (Thesis “Interaction Models in the Slope Geomorphology”, defended in MSU, Research Advisor – Professor Y.G. Simonov).

In 1998 he became a Doctor of Geographical Sciences (Thesis “Dynamics, Stability and Control over of the Marine Shore Eco Geosystems”, defended in Kharkov State University, Research Supervisor – Professor V.E. Nekos).

Since 1997 he has worked as a professor in Kharkov State (National) University (since 2006 – part-time Professor position, since 2012 – acting Head of the Ecology and Neoecology Department).

Since 2006 he has worked in Belgorod State University/BSU (until 2007 as an active Vice Prorector of Research Work, since 2007 as a professor of World Economy Department, since 2013 as a Head of the Center of Scientometrics and University Competitiveness Supporting).

Since 2023, he has served as an Independent Researcher (Vimperk, Czechia; Kharkov, Ukraine).

From 1976 to 1984 he was a member Work Group (later Commission) “System Analysis and Mathematical Modeling” of International Geographical Union.

From 1980 to 1990 he worked as a Freelance Referent for the VINITI (All-Union Institute of Scientific and Technical Information), Moscow

Since 2007, he has published his works in journals such as Scientific and Technical Information Processing, Automatic Documentation and Mathematical Linguistics, Webology, Cybermetrics and others.

Since 2008 he has published articles on General Scientific Problems in Academic Periodicals “Poisk” and “Troitskiy Variant”, on the Internet Portals “Rosnauka” and “Chastny Korrespondent” (Moscow).

Since 2008 he made a significant contribution to the integration of the post Soviet Universities into the international movement of the Open Access to the scientific knowledge (Belgorod Declaration of the Open Access to the scientific knowledge and cultural heritage, creating a chain of the Open Access repositories in Russian and Ukrainian border zone Universities).

Since 2017- to date -National Open Access Contact Point Coordinator of OA2020Initiative (Max Planck Digital Library).

== Scientific contributions ==
During the 1980s he created a harmonious system of diffusion models of relief development on a fundamental mathematical basis (boundary problems of the mathematical physics of diffusion type) in compliance with the knowledge of mechanism of geomorphological process.

During the 1990s he laid the theoretical foundation for the dynamics, stability and control over of the marine shore systems on the basis of the dynamic system's qualitative theory.

At the end of the 20th century the beginning of the 21st introduces systematic information and scientometric approach to research practice; laid the foundation for a conception of the mathematical modeling of the competitive and cooperative interaction in social and economic systems; developed benchmarking (matrix and analytical) tools for the comparative studies of the territorial and innovative systems; developed a methodological tools which help to improve academic competitiveness of the Universities and Scientific Periodicals.

In 1994 he received one of the first mathematical description of the Laffer curve.

During the 2000s he made a key contribution into the study of early period of scientific activity of the Nobel Prize winner in economics – Simon Kuznets.

In 2010, he was included in Open Access bibliography called “Transforming Scholarly Publishing Through Open Access: A Bibliography” by a famous American bibliographer Charles W. Bailey, Jr.

In 2016, he was among the 22 most productive researchers on the theme of open access who published at least five "Scopus" articles in the period up to 2014.

== Writings ==
In 1983, he co-wrote Mathematic Modeling in the Slope Geomorphology, with A.M. Trofimov.

He has written around 600 articles in Russian, and 80 in English.
