= National Weatherperson's Day =

U.S. holiday

- Observed by: Meteorologists, weather enthusiasts
- Date: February 5
- Next time: 5 February 2027
- Frequency: annual

National Weatherperson's Day, also known as National Weatherman's Day, is observed on February 5 primarily in the United States. It recognizes individuals in the fields of meteorology, weather forecasting and broadcast meteorology, as well as volunteer storm spotters and observers. It is observed on the birthday of John Jeffries, one of the United States' first weather observers who took daily measurements starting in 1774, born on February 5, 1744.

Jeffries made the first balloon flight over London in 1784 with the purpose of gathering data for a scientific study of the air at high altitudes.
