= Hazel Keyes =

American balloonist

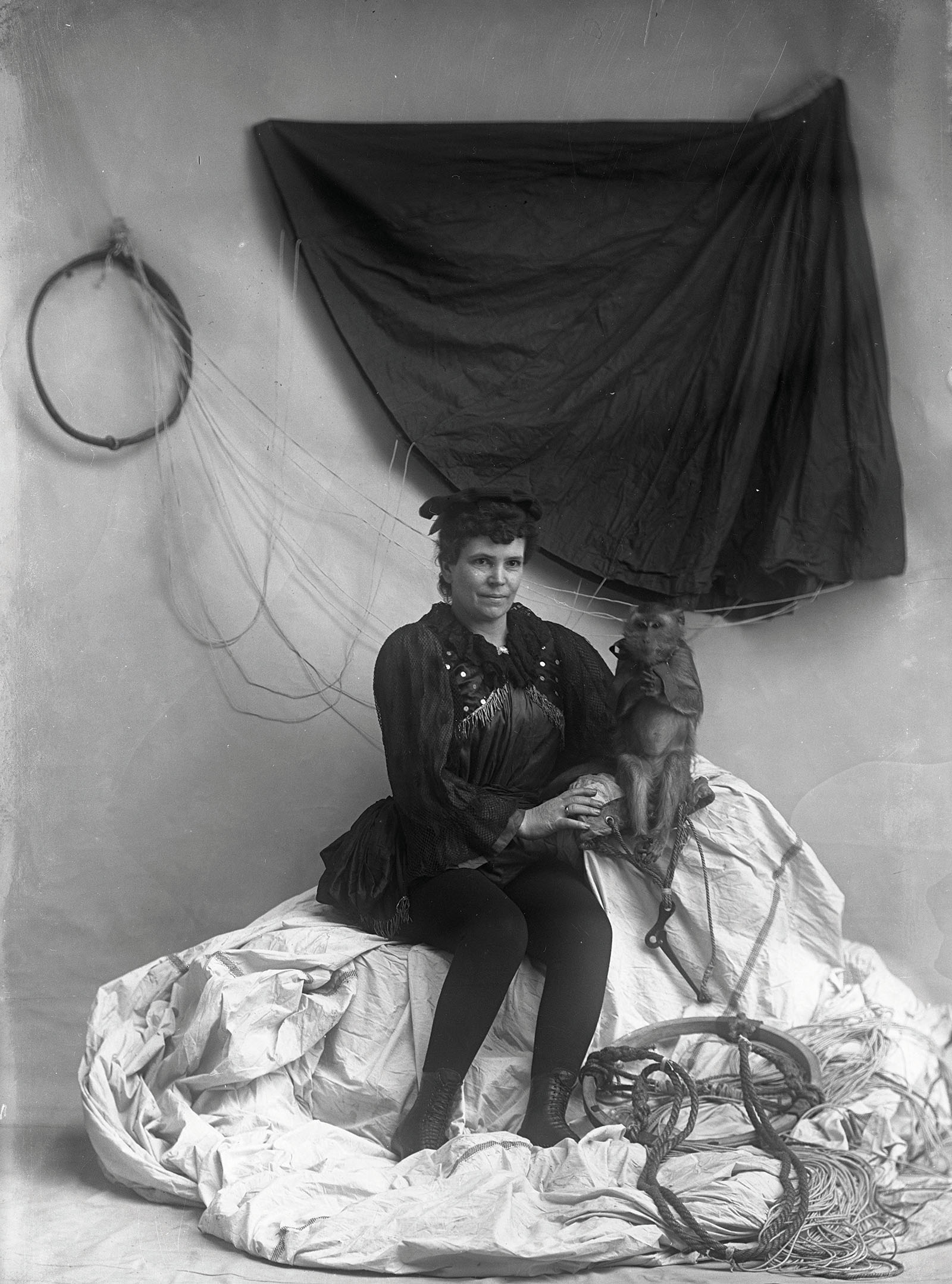
Portrait of Keyes next to her pet monkey

Hazel Keyes (1861–1940) was an American balloonist known for her stunts where she would parachute off of a hot air balloon alongside her husband and pet monkey, named Jennie Yan Yan. Throughout the years of 1890 and 1900, Keyes completed around 300 flights and jumps. She died of heart disease in a nursing home in 1940 at the age of 79. The The San Diego Union-Tribune once described her as the "Evel Knievel of the 19th century".

== Early life and career ==
Hazel Keyes was born in 1861 in West Whittier-Los Nietos, California, under the name Martha H. Horton to her parents Adeline Redmond and William Horton, a farm laborer. When Keyes was 15, she and her family moved to Oregon where she later met her first husband Joseph Keyes. She would end up having four children with Joseph Keyes. Keyes originally worked as a nurse before changing course to become an aeronaut.

Keyes had begun her ballooning career in 1890 when she started training with a man named James J. Romig, with whom she had an affair with and later remarried with. She began training with Romig in an attempt to raise money to feed her family, and on August 31, 1890 she did her first public jump with a tandem parachute with him.

Keyes performed many publicity stunts during her career, including a flight in 1894 where she flew 1,000 feet in the air with a steel cable attached to her hair. Around a fourth of her flights ended with complications that frequently left her injured when she was forced to crash land.
