= John Jeffries =

American physician and scientist (1744–1819)

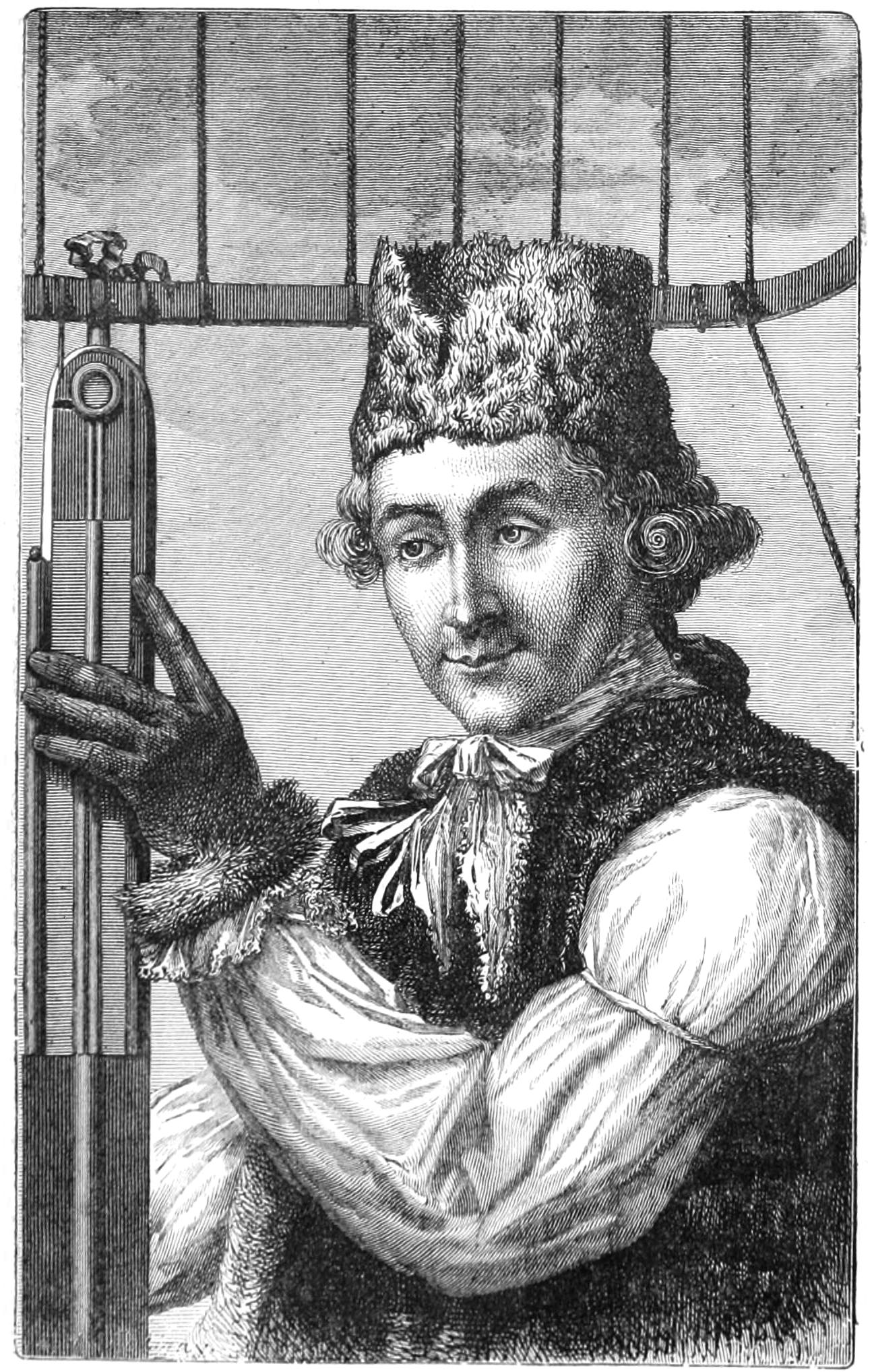
- John Jeffries
- Born: 5 February 1745; Boston
- Died: 16 September 1819 (aged 75); Boston
- Resting place: Granary Burying Ground
- Education: Harvard College, University of Aberdeen
- Occupations: physician, surgeon
- Employer: British Army
- Known for: ballooning
- Title: Surgeon General of British Forces in North America 1776–1780
- Spouses: Sarah Jeffries (née Rhoads) (m. 1770; died 1780); Hannah Jeffries (née Hunt) (m. 1787)
- Children: 2

John Jeffries (5 February 1745 – 16 September 1819) was an American medical doctor, scientist, and military surgeon with the British Army in Nova Scotia and New York during the American Revolution. He is best known for accompanying French inventor Jean-Pierre Blanchard on his 1785 balloon flight across the English Channel.

== Biography ==
Coat of Arms of John Jeffries

Born in Boston, Jeffries graduated from Harvard College [Class of 1763] and obtained his medical degree at the University of Aberdeen. Jeffries played a role in the trial for the Boston Massacre as a witness for the defense. He was the surgeon for Patrick Carr, who was one of the Americans shot during that incident.

Between 1771 through 1774 Jeffries was a surgeon on board a squadron of British ships in Boston Harbor and helped the wounded British soldiers on 17 June 1775 at the Battle of Bunker Hill.

Jeffries is credited with being among America's first weather observers. He began taking daily weather measurements in 1774 in Boston, as well as taking weather observations in a balloon over London in 1784. National Weatherperson's Day is celebrated in his honor on 5 February, his birthday. The Archives and Special Collections at Amherst College holds a collection of his papers, including a letter he dropped from the balloon during his historic flight, considered the oldest piece of airmail in existence.

He fled to Halifax, Nova Scotia in 1776 and later to England 1779, and was employed by the Crown during this time.

In 1785, Jeffries and Jean-Pierre Blanchard crossed the English Channel in a balloon, becoming the first human beings to cross the Channel by air.

Jeffries lived in England from 1779 to 1790. Despite being named in the Massachusetts Banishment Act, he returned to private practice in Boston, staying there until his death in 1819. His son John Jeffries II (1796–1876) was an ophthalmic surgeon and co-founded the Massachusetts Charitable Eye and Ear Infirmary.
