= House of White of Tuxford and Wallingwells =

The House of White of Tuxford and Wallingwells is an ancient family, which primarily lived in Nottinghamshire over many centuries. From 1802 the head of the family has been a baronet, the title having been conferred on Sir Thomas Woollaston White, 1st Bt., by King George III.

== List of heads of family ==
People noted in italics are those who would have succeeded as the head of the family had they survived their elder brother.

Name	Born	Died
Johannes White of Colyngham (living 1428)	Unknown	Unknown
John White	Unknown	1567
Thomas White	Unknown	26 October 1580
Sir John White, Knt.	1558	1625
Thomas White	1590	13 April 1638
John White	3 September 1634	16 April 1713
Thomas White	August 1667	30 September 1732
John White	2 December 1699	7 September 1769
Taylor White	21 December 1701	27 March 1772
Taylor White	5 November 1743	20 July 1795
Sir Thomas White, 1st Bt.	20 January 1767	28 October 1817
Sir Thomas White, 2nd Bt.	3 October 1801	7 August 1882
Sir Thomas White, 3rd Bt.	7 February 1828	28 May 1907
William Knight Hamilton Ramsay White	23 January 1834	11 June 1900
Sir Archibald White, 4th Bt.	14 October 1877	20 December 1945
Sir Thomas White, 5th Bt.	13 May 1904	16 May 1996
Captain Richard White, RN	29 January 1908	3 March 1995
Sir Nicholas White, 6th Bt.	2 March 1939	
Christopher White, Esq. (heir apparent to the baronetcy)	20 July 1972	
