= Milton Mausoleum =

Coordinates: 53.2493°N 0.9297°W

- All Saints Church, West Markham
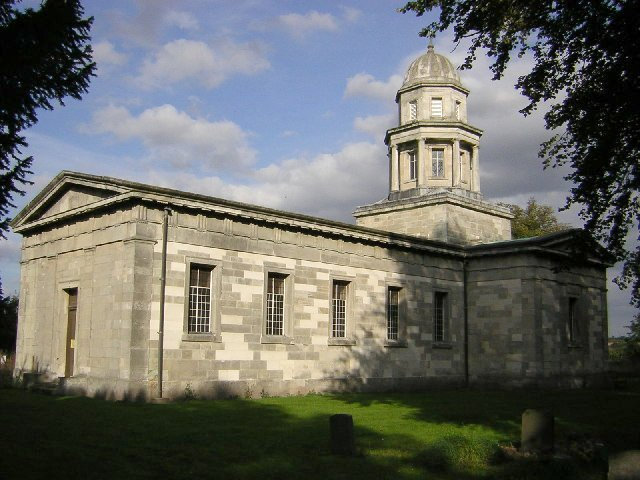
- Milton Mausoleum from the southwest

- Location in Nottinghamshire
- OS grid reference: SK 715 730
- Location: Milton, Nottinghamshire
- Country: England
- Denomination: Anglican
- Website: Churches Conservation Trust

History
- Founder: 4th Duke of Newcastle
- Consecrated: 27 December 1833

Architecture
- Functional status: Redundant
- Heritage designation: Grade I
- Designated: 1 February 1967
- Architect: Sir Robert Smirke
- Style: Neoclassical
- Completed: 1833
- Closed: 1950s

Specifications
- Materials: Stone ashlar, lead roofs

The Milton Mausoleum is a redundant Anglican church in the village of Milton, Nottinghamshire, England. It is recorded in the National Heritage List for England as a designated Grade I listed building, and is under the care of The Churches Conservation Trust. The church, which stands on a hill and is visible from the Markham Moor junction on the A1 road, has also been known as All Saints Church, West Markham, and been confused with the medieval parish church of All Saints' Church, West Markham.

== History ==
The building was commissioned by the 4th Duke of Newcastle in memory of his wife. It was designed by Sir Robert Smirke and completed in 1833. Most of the building served as a family mausoleum, with the nave as a parish church. It was consecrated by the Archbishop of York on 27 December 1833. It closed as a parish church in the 1950s, and was vested in the Churches Conservation Trust. It is the only surviving mausoleum in Nottinghamshire.

== Architecture ==
=== Exterior ===
The mausoleum is designed in Neoclassical style, and constructed in ashlar stone with lead roofs and set on a plinth. It has a cruciform plan, with a Doric pilasters at each corner supporting an entablature and pedimented gables. It contains a nave, tomb chambers to the north and south acting as transepts, and a mausoleum at the east end. At the crossing is an octagonal lantern set on a square base. It has two stages, the lower stages consisting of a colonnade of eight Doric columns with rectangular windows in the walls between them. The top stage consists of an octagonal drum containing eight louvred openings, and this is surmounted by a dome with a cross. Two steps lead to a central doorway in the west front. The doorway is flanked by pilasters and has a moulded architrave. On the north and south sides of the nave are five rectangular windows. There are similar windows on the north and south sides on the transepts. The east front contains a portico with four free-standing Doric columns.

=== Interior ===
Inside the west entrance is a porch, with a doorway on the south side, and steps leading up to a gallery to the north. At the east end of the nave is a screen in Ionic style with a dentil cornice containing boards painted with biblical texts. In the nave are box pews. Its ceiling is panelled, and on the south wall is a monument dated 1863. Beyond the screen is a rotunda with four round archways alternating with four round-arched niches. In the south chamber is a mid 19th-century memorial to the Dukes of Newcastle, carved by William Grinsell Nicholl. On its south wall is a board containing seven brass memorial plaques. The eastern arch leads by a passage to the east door. On its south side is a door leading to the vestry, and on the north side a similar door leads to steps down to the burial vault.

== See also ==
- Grade I listed buildings in Nottinghamshire
- Listed buildings in West Markham
- List of churches preserved by the Churches Conservation Trust in the English Midlands
