= St Nicholas' Church, Tuxford =

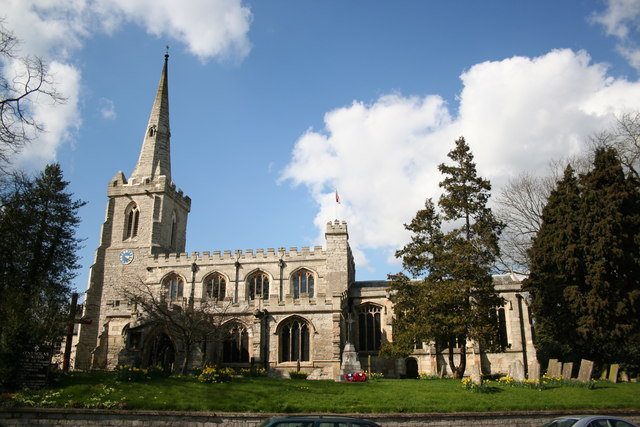
- St Nicholas's Church, Tuxford
- St Nicholas' Church, Tuxford
- 53°13′51.37″N 0°53′50.57″W
- OS grid reference: SK 73667 71064
- Location: Tuxford
- Country: England
- Denomination: Church of England
- Website: www.tuxfordchurches.co.uk

History
- Dedication: St Nicholas

Architecture
- Heritage designation: Grade I listed

Administration
- Province: York
- Diocese: Diocese of Southwell and Nottingham
- Archdeaconry: Newark
- Deanery: Newark and Southwell
- Parish: Tuxford

Clergy
- Bishop(s): Bishop of Sherwood & Bishop of Southwell & Nottingham
- Vicar: Vacancy (Priest in Charge)
- Dean: Rev Milner (Area Dean)

St Nicholas's Church is a Grade I listed parish church in the Church of England in Tuxford, Nottinghamshire.

== History ==
The church was built in the 12th century. The clerestory was added in 1374, and the chancel was rebuilt around 1495 by Gunthorpe. The chapel was restored and widened in the 18th century, and there was restoration work in 1811, 1879 and 1893. In the 1980s the church became part of a benefice which had the churches of West Markham and Weston. In February 2013 another two churches became part of the benefice, Marnham and Normanton on Trent.

== The White Chapel ==
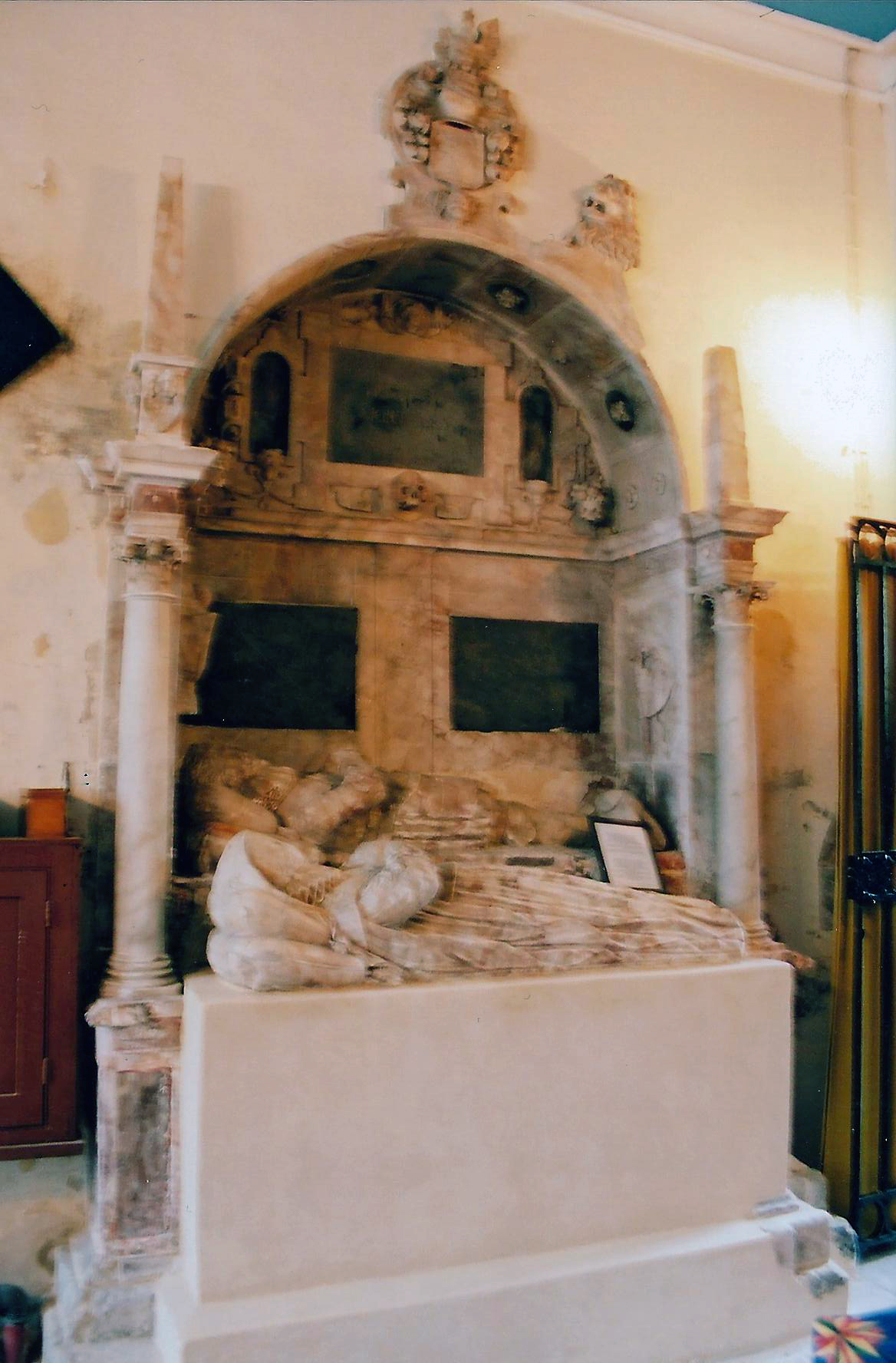
The tomb of Sir John and Lady White in the White Chapel of the Church of St. Nicholas, Tuxford

To the north of the Chancel is the mortuary chapel of the Whites of Tuxford and Wallingwells. The fine alabaster tomb to Sir John White (1558–1625) and his wife Agnes Cecil (sister of Queen Elizabeth I's Lord Treasurer, Lord Burghley) is situated within the chapel.

Within the chapel is also a memorial tablet to Captain Charles Lawrence White (the youngest brother of Sir Thomas White, 1st Baronet), who died in the Siege of Bayonne in 1814. The tablet depicts the martyrdom of St. Lawrence on the gridiron.

Below the chapel is the burial vault wherein rest members of the White family, including Sir Thomas White, 1st Baronet, and his heir, Sir Thomas White, 2nd Baronet. A second, earlier, burial vault is to be found below the Chancel. This vault contains the remains of members of the Stanhope family of Rampton, as well as earlier generations of the Whites.

On the walls of the chapel can be found two stunningly painted funerary hatchments. The first depicts the conjugal arms of Sir Thomas White, 1st Baronet, whilst the second hatchment shows the full achievement of arms of Sir Thomas White, 2nd Baronet.

The last head of the White family to live primarily at Tuxford Manor, Thomas White, is buried beneath the High Altar of the church.

== Parish status ==
It is in a parish with:

- All Saints' Church, West Markham
- All Saints' Church, Weston, Nottinghamshire
- St Matthew, Normanton on Trent;and
- St Wilfrid, Marnham

== Organ ==
The church contains an organ dating from 1861 by Robert Postill of York. A specification of the organ can be found on the National Pipe Organ Register.

== Bells ==
The church currently has eight bells. The church started off with 4 bells then another one added making five and again another bell. In 1926 they were all recast and hung in a frame for eight. In 1956 two new bells were added making a full octave of eight.

== Clergy ==
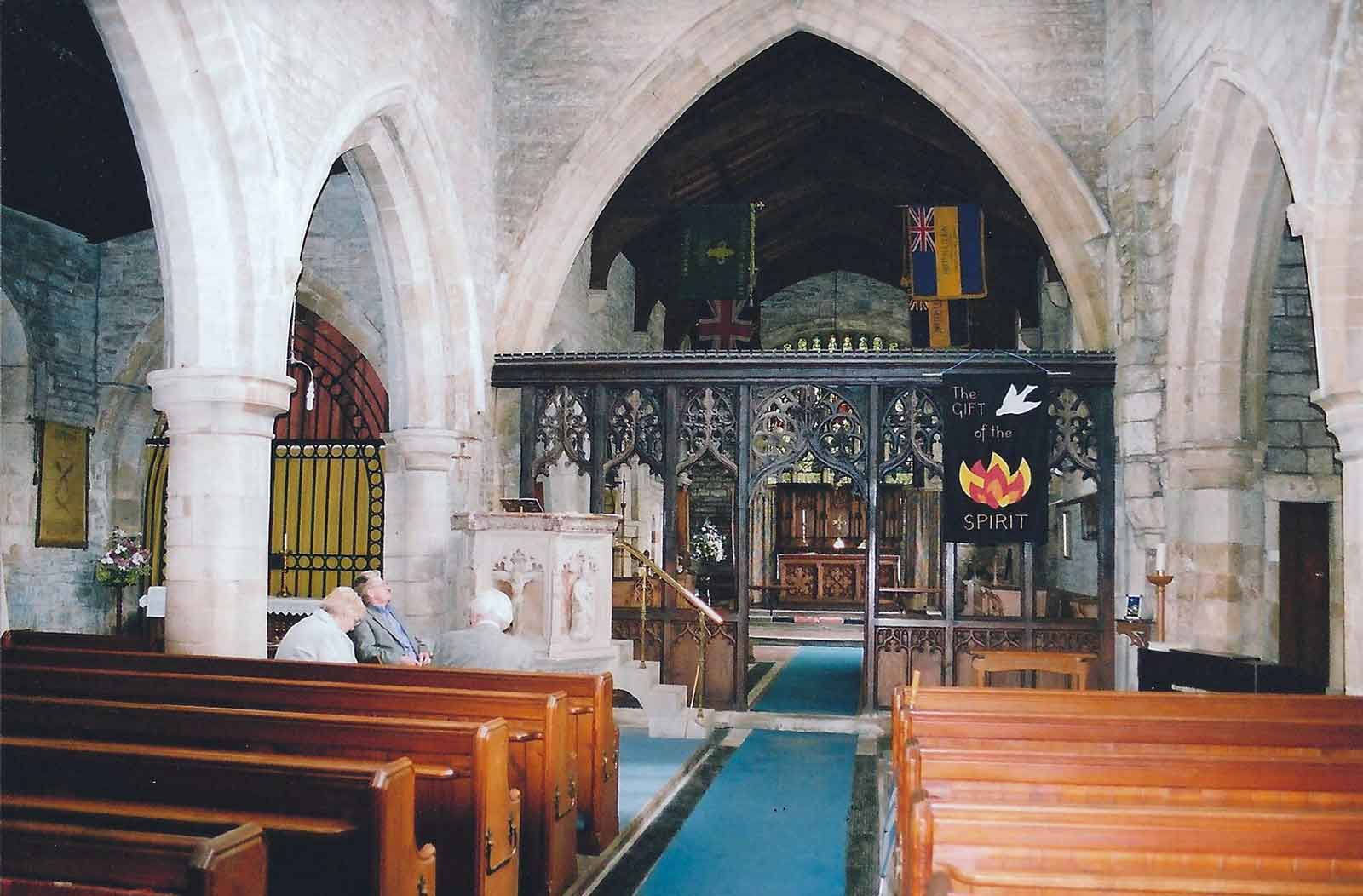
The Nave of St. Nicholas's Church, Tuxford (2004)

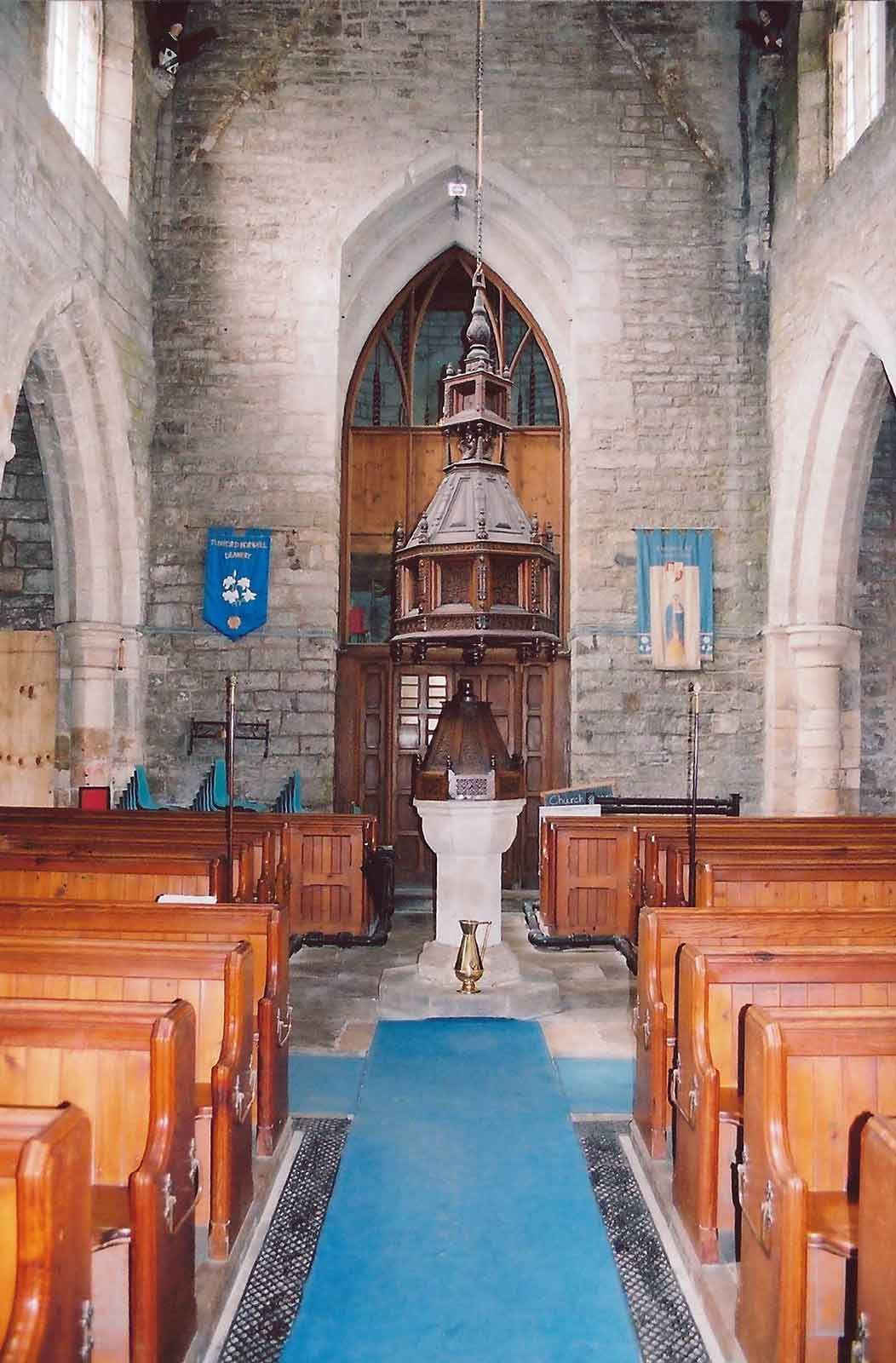
The Font and its remarkable cover in St. Nicholas's Church, Tuxford

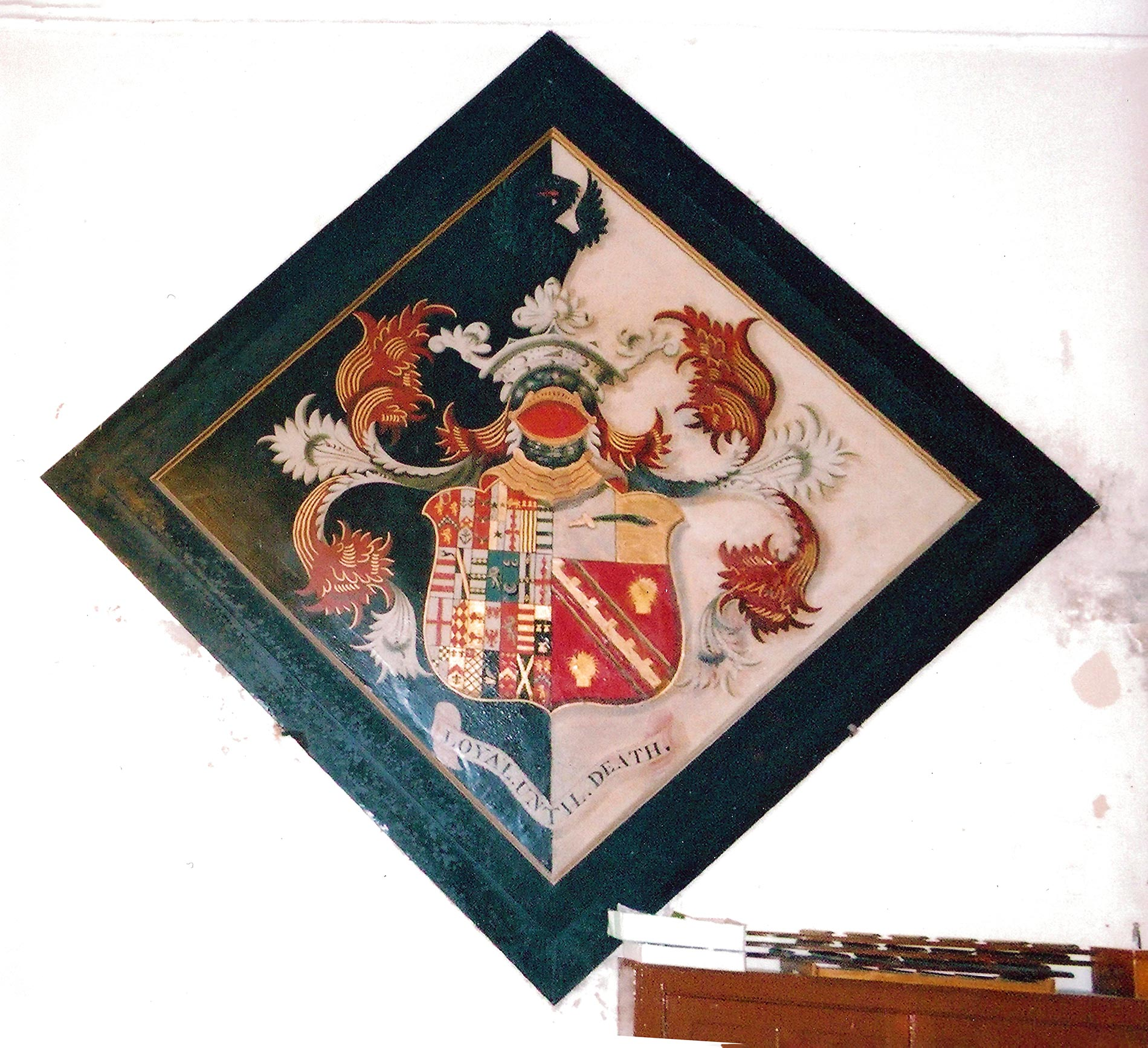
The Funerary Hatchment of Sir Thomas White, 1st Baronet of Tuxford and Wallingwells in the White mortuary chapel in St. Nicholas, Tuxford

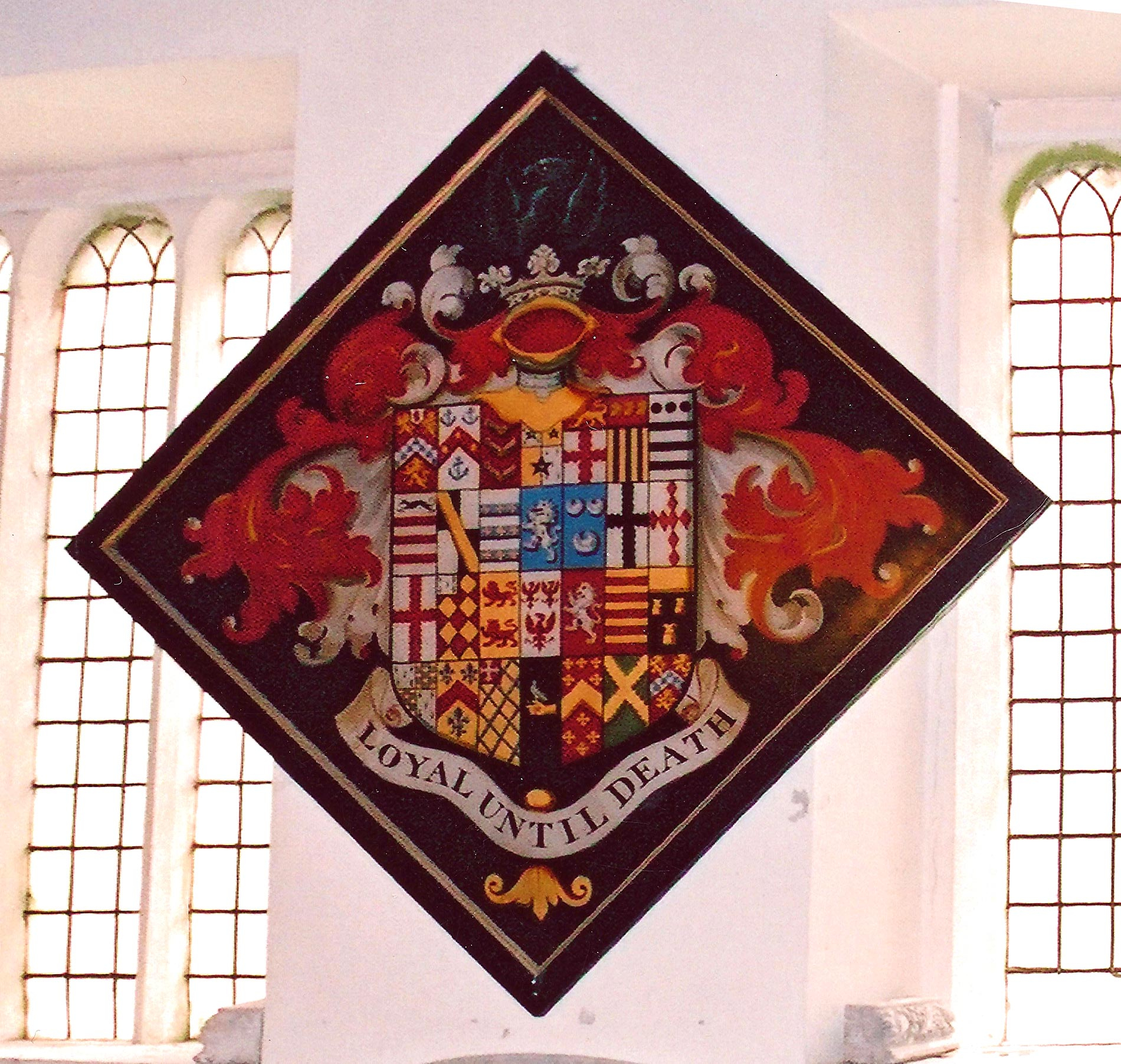
The Funerary Hatchment of Sir Thomas White, 2nd Baronet of Tuxford and Wallingwells in the White mortuary chapel in St. Nicholas, Tuxford

In 2006 The Rev Wall came to the Parish as Priest in Charge. The Rev Dunk in 2013 as the Curate. .Previous Clergy:

- Rev C Wall Priest in Charge from 2006 - June 2014
- Rev E Thomas
- Rev J Martin

== See also ==
- Grade I listed buildings in Nottinghamshire
- Listed buildings in Tuxford
