= All Saints' Church, West Markham =

All Saints' Church
- All Saints' Church, West Markham
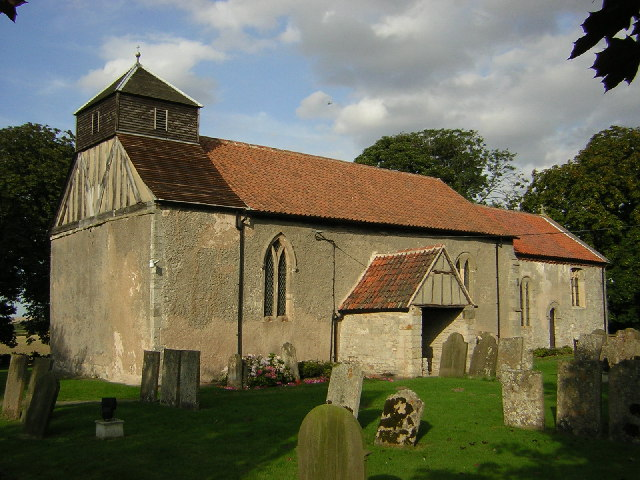
- All Saints' Church
- All Saints' Church
- 53°14′43.92″N 0°55′15.54″W
- OS grid reference: SK 72143 72684
- Location: West Markham
- Country: England
- Denomination: Church of England

History
- Dedication: All Saints

Architecture
- Heritage designation: Grade I listed

Administration
- Province: York
- Diocese: Diocese of Southwell and Nottingham
- Archdeaconry: Newark
- Deanery: Newark and Southwell
- Parish: Markham Clinton

Clergy
- Bishop: Rt Rev Porter (Bishop of Sherwood)
- Dean: Rev Milner Area Dean

All Saints' Church is a Grade I listed parish church in the Church of England serving the parish of Markham Clinton in West Markham, Nottinghamshire.

== History ==
The church was built in the 12th century. It was repaired in 1872 and restored between 1930 and 1945. It is in a parish with two other churches:

- St Nicholas' Church, Tuxford
- All Saints' Church, Weston, Nottinghamshire

Somewhat confusingly, Milton Mausoleum is sometimes also referred to as All Saints' Church, West Markham.

== Organ ==
The church contains an Organ dating from 1860 by Bevington and Sons.

== Bell ==
The church has one bell which is hung on half a wheel and is swing chimed.

== Burials ==
The church is the burial place of Henry Pelham-Clinton, 4th Duke of Newcastle. After his wife died in 1822, the 4th Duke built a church and mausoleum at Milton, Nottinghamshire, which was completed in 1833, and replaced All Saints as the parish church. In 1949 All Saints became the parish church again after restoration; the Mausoleum was left to decay until 1972 when it was taken into guardianship by the Churches Conservation Trust.

== Group of Churches ==
West Markham church is part of the Tuxford Benefice.

- St Nicholas, Tuxford
- All Saints', West Markham
- All Saints', Weston
- St Matthew, Normanton on Trent;and
- St Wilfrid, Marnham

== See also ==
- Grade I listed buildings in Nottinghamshire
- Listed buildings in West Markham
