= Listed buildings in West Markham =

West Markham is a civil parish in the Bassetlaw District of Nottinghamshire, England. The parish contains four listed buildings that are recorded in the National Heritage List for England. Of these, two are listed at Grade I, the highest of the three grades, and the others are at Grade II, the lowest grade. The parish contains the village of West Markham and the surrounding area. The listed buildings consist of a church and headstones in its churchyard, and a mausoleum and its surrounding walls and railings.

== Key ==
Grade	Criteria
I	Buildings of exceptional interest, sometimes considered to be internationally important
II	Buildings of national importance and special interest

== Buildings ==
Name and location	Photograph	Date	Notes	Grade
All Saints' Church; 53.24632°N 0.92033°W		Late 12th century	The church has been altered and extended through the centuries. It is mainly in rendered brick with pantile roofs, and consists of a nave, a south porch and a chancel. The upper part of the west end is timber framed, and it is surmounted by a weatherboarded turret with louvred openings and a pyramidal roof. In the south wall of the chancel is a 12th-century round-arched doorway with a chamfered surround, imposts and a hood mould.	I
Row of four headstones 53.24620°N 0.92017°W	—	1725	The headstones are in the churchyard of All Saints' Church, to the south of the chancel, and are to the memory of members of the Minnit (or Minute) family. They consist of rectangular headstones with shaped heads and are dated between 1725 and 1758.	II
Milton Mausoleum; 53.24931°N 0.92972°W		1832	The mausoleum was designed by Sir Robert Smirke in Neoclassical style for the 4th Duke of Newcastle. It is in stone with roofs of lead and slate, and has a cruciform plan, consisting of a nave, tomb chambers to the north and south acting as transepts, and a mausoleum at the east end. At the crossing is an octagonal lantern with two stages, the lower stage has a colonnade of Doric columns, and the upper stage is an octagonal drum surmounted by a dome with a cross. At each corner of the mausoleum are pilasters supporting an entablature and pedimented gables, and the east front contains a portico with four free-standing Doric columns.	I
Walls and railings, Milton Mausoleum; 53.24898°N 0.92957°W	—	1832	The walls and railings enclosing the grounds were designed by Sir Robert Smirke. Most of the area is surrounded by low stone walls with spiked iron railings, and part of it has a wall in yellow brick with stone coping.	II
