= Ruth Alcock =

Ruth Alcock may refer to:

- Ruth Alcock, character in The Lakes (TV series)
- Ruth Alcock (Quakeress) (1718–1809), English Quakeress
