= Listed buildings in Tuxford =

Tuxford is a civil parish in the Bassetlaw District of Nottinghamshire, England. The parish contains 27 listed buildings that are recorded in the National Heritage List for England. Of these, one is listed at Grade I, the highest of the three grades, one is at Grade II*, the middle grade, and the others are at Grade II, the lowest grade. The parish contains the market town of Tuxford and the surrounding countryside. Most of the listed buildings are houses, cottages, shops and associated structures. The others include a church with items in and around the churchyard, former schools, a former hotel and public house, a commemorative stone, farmhouses and farm buildings, a village lock-up, two windmills, a decorative lamp post, and a war memorial.

== Key ==
Grade	Criteria
I	Buildings of exceptional interest, sometimes considered to be internationally important
II*	Particularly important buildings of more than special interest
II	Buildings of national importance and special interest

== Buildings ==
Name and location	Photograph	Date	Notes	Grade
St Nicholas' Church; 53.23155°N 0.89785°W		12th century	The church has been altered and extended through the centuries, including a series of restorations in the 19th century. It is built in stone, and consists of a nave with a clerestory, north and south aisles, north and south porches, a north chapel and a vestry, a southeast rood turret, a chancel, and a west steeple. The steeple has a tower with two stages, a plinth, diagonal buttresses, two gargoyles, an embattled parapet, and a broach spire with one tier of lucarnes, each with a hood mould and a finial. On the west side is an arched doorway with a chamfered surround, a traceried fanlight and a hood mould, above which is a single-light window and stair lights, on the south side is a clock face, and the bell openings have two lights and hood moulds. There are also embattled parapets on the nave, the aisles, and the rood turret.	I
The Old Grammar School, wall, gate and steps 53.23125°N 0.89712°W		1669	The grammar school, later a library, is in red brick on a moulded plinth, with stone dressings, brick quoins, a floor band, sprocketed eaves, and a hipped pantile roof. There are two storeys and attics, and a front of five bays. In the centre is a doorway flanked by rusticated pilasters with painted orb finials. Above the doorway is a shaped and inscribed panel, over which is a moulded and painted segmental floating hood mould. The windows are sashes, and in the attic are three box dormers, Between the ground floor windows is a bell in a wood and pantile frame, and at the rear of the building is a stair turret. Enclosing the grounds is a brick wall with moulded coping, and in the centre is a wrought iron gate approached by three semicircular steps, and flanked by brick piers with shaped stone coping.	II*
5 Eldon Street; 53.23124°N 0.89920°W		Mid 18th century	A shop with living accommodation above, it is stuccoed, and has a pantile roof. There are three storeys and three bays, and rear extensions. In the ground floor is a late 19th-century shop front, containing a central recessed doorway with a fanlight, flanked by shop windows, over which is an entablature. In the middle floor are sash windows, the top floor contains casement windows, and all these windows have keystones.	II
14, 16 and 18 Eldon Street; 53.23147°N 0.89912°W		18th century	A row of three shops with living accommodation above, in colourwashed red brick, with a rendered base and a partial plinth, dogtooth eaves, and a pantile roof, hipped on the left. There are two storeys and three bays. In the ground floor are three late 19th-century shop fronts flanked by pilasters, each containing a doorway with pilasters and a fanlight, over which is a continuous entablature. The upper floor contains sash windows.	II
12 Ollerton Road; 53.23150°N 0.90071°W		Mid 18th century	The house is in red brick on a rendered base, with floor bands, dogtooth eaves, and a pantile roof with brick coped gables and kneelers. There are three storeys and three bays, and a two-storey rear wing. The central doorway has a fanlight, and the windows are casements with flush wedge lintels and keystones.	II
Former Newcastle Arms; 53.23096°N 0.89875°W		Mid 18th century	A hotel and public house on a corner site, later used for other purposes, it is stuccoed, on a partial plinth, and has a cornice with a panelled parapet, and a hipped slate roof. There are two storeys and a quadrangle plan around a courtyard, with a front range of seven bays. In the centre is a Doric porch with a wrought iron balcony, and a doorway flanked by reeded pilaster strips with paterae, and marginal lights with pilaster strips. This is flanked by canted bay windows with entablatures, and the other windows are sashes with moulded surrounds. In the right bay is a 19th-century shop window with pilasters and an entablature. The south front has two storeys and six bays, and contains a segmental carriage archway.	II
Rebel Stone; 53.22335°N 0.88435°W		Mid 18th century	A rectangular stone about 2 metres (6 ft 7 in) high, splayed at the base and with a moulded top. On the south side is a defaced inscription.	II
The Mail House; 53.23115°N 0.89911°W		Mid 18th century	A shop with living accommodation above, it is in colourwashed brick on a plinth, with a partial floor band, a wooden cornice and a slate roof. There are two storeys and attics, a main range of six bays, and two-storey rear extensions. On the front is a Greek Doric porch flanked by canted bay windows. In the left bay is a round-arched carriageway, the windows are sashes, and in the attic are two box dormers.	II
The Old Vicarage; 53.23058°N 0.89705°W		Mid 18th century	The vicarage, later a private house, is in red brick with dentilled and dogtooth eaves, pantile roofs and two storeys. The main block has three bays, a central doorway with a traceried fanlight, flanked by Tuscan three-quarter columns supporting an open pediment, and the windows are sashes. To the left is a single bay with a casement window, and projecting to the left is a single bay with a hipped roof. To the right and recessed is a single bay, to the rear is a two-bay wing, and to the left and recessed is a three-bay wing with a slate roof.	II
Pump Farmhouse; 53.23244°N 0.89542°W		Late 18th century	The farmhouse is in red brick, with dentilled eaves, and a pantile roof with a raised brick coped gable and kneelers on the left. There are two storeys, three bays, a single bay extension, and a rear lean-to. The doorway and the windows, which are horizontally-sliding sashes, are under segmental arches.	II
The Mount; 53.23730°N 0.90256°W	—	Late 18th century	A red brick house on a rendered plinth, with a wooden cornice, and a pantile roof with brick coped gables and kneelers. There are two storeys and three bays. In the centre is a gabled porch and a doorway with a fanlight. The windows are sashes, those in the ground floor under segmental arches. Recessed on the left is a single-storey four-bay outbuilding, and recessed on the right is a wing with dentilled eaves, a single storey and an attic, and a conservatory.	II
Tuxford Hall; 53.23187°N 0.89680°W	—	c. 1785	The house is in red brick with floor bands, dentilled eaves and a hipped pantile roof. There are three storeys, a front of three bays, and extensive rear extensions. In the centre of the east front, steps lead up to a doorway with fluted pilasters, a traceried fanlight, and an entablature. This is flanked by canted bay windows, and the other windows on the front are sashes. In the centre of the north front is a two-storey bay window flanked by three-storey projecting bow windows with rendered embattled parapets.	II
The Old Lock Up; 53.22959°N 0.89975°W		1823	The lock up is in red brick with dogtooth eaves and a hipped pantile roof. There is a single storey and three bays. In the centre is a doorway with an iron door under a cambered arch, above which is an oval stucco dated panel. The outer bays contain blind recessed round-arched panels, each with a small circular opening.	II
7 Eldon Street; 53.23128°N 0.89930°W		Early 19th century	A shop with living accommodation above, it is in rendered brick, with a wooden cornice and a slate roof. There are two storeys and three bays. In the centre is a doorway with a fanlight, flanked by large segmental shop windows, over which is an entablature with consoles. The upper floor contains two casement windows with decorative flush wedge lintels and keystones.	II
42 Lincoln Road; 53.23248°N 0.89298°W	—	Early 19th century	A red brick house with floor bands, dentilled eaves and a hipped pantile roof. There are three storeys, three bays, and two-storey and lean-to extensions at the rear. In the centre is a trellis porch and a doorway with a wedge lintel and a fluted keystone. The windows are sashes with wedge lintels and keystones.	II
8 and 10 Market Place; 53.23110°N 0.89788°W		Early 19th century	A house and a shop, later combined into one house, it is in brick with a partial floor band, dentilled eaves and a pantile roof. There are two storeys and five bays, and two-storey rear wings. To the right is a late 19th-century shop front, consisting of a doorway with pilasters and a fanlight, to the right are two sash windows, also with pilasters, and above is an entablature with a moulded cornice. In the second bay, steps lead up to a doorway with a fanlight, and the windows in both floor are sashes with margin lights; all these openings have flush wedge lintels and keystones.	II
4, 6 and 8 Ollerton Road; 53.23165°N 0.90040°W		Early 19th century	A row of three cottages in red brick, with a floor band, dentilled eaves and a pantile roof. There are two storeys and three bays. On the front are three doorways, and casement windows, some with a single light, and others with two lights. The doorway and two-light casement windows have flush wedge lintels and keystones.	II
Georgian House; 53.23088°N 0.89812°W		Early 19th century	The house is in red brick, with floor bands, dentilled eaves and hipped pantile roofs. There are three storeys, three bays, and flanking two-storey single-bay wings. The central doorway has a fanlight, the windows are sashes, and all the openings have moulded surrounds and segmental heads.	II
Merryfields Farmhouse; 53.22982°N 0.85850°W		Early 19th century	The farmhouse is in red brick, with floor bands, dentilled eaves and a hipped slate roof. There are three storeys, three bays, and a later lower two-storey rear wing. In the centre is a doorway with a fanlight, the windows are sashes, and all the openings are under cambered arches.	II
St John's College Farm; 53.22719°N 0.90010°W		Early 19th century	A farmhouse in red brick, with a floor band, dentilled eaves and a pantile roof. There are two storeys and attics, three bays, and a later lower two-storey rear wing with a slate roof. The doorway has a fanlight, the windows are sashes, and all the openings are under cambered relieving arches.	II
The Chantry; 53.23170°N 0.89825°W		Early 19th century	The house is in roughcast red brick and has a slate roof. There are two storeys, a main range of four bays, a single-storey outbuilding on the right, and a two-storey rear wing. On the front is a Tuscan porch, and a doorway with a fanlight in a panelled and arched reveal, and the windows are sashes.	II
The Old School House; 53.22983°N 0.89633°W		Early 19th century	The school, later a house, is stuccoed with pantile roofs. There are three gabled ranges, the middle one with two storeys and three bays, and the outer ranges projecting with a single storey and a single bay. In the centre is a doorway, above it is a blind panel, and the windows are casements with arched overlights; all the openings are under Tudor arches.	II
Windmill, Mill Mount; 53.23816°N 0.90282°W		Early 19th century	A tower windmill in tarred red brick, with dogtooth and raised brick eaves bands, and three storeys. The ground floor contains two doorways and two windows, in the middle floor are three windows and a doorway, and in the top floor are two windows. The sails and fantail have been restored.	II
Windmill, Stone Road End; 53.21587°N 0.86197°W		Mid 19th century	A tower windmill in tarred red brick, with dogtooth and raised brick eaves bands, and four storeys. The ground floor contains two doorways, two windows and a projecting stone platform, and in each of the upper floors are two windows.	II
Wall, gate piers and gates, St Nicholas' Church; 53.23128°N 0.89787°W		Late 19th century	The wall along the south side of the churchyard is in rendered brick with stone coping, and extends for 70 metres (230 ft). At the east end are rendered brick piers with stone coping and a single decorative iron gate, and at the west end are stone piers with coping, between which are double iron gates and an overthrow with a lamp.	II
Jubilee Lamp Post; 53.23110°N 0.89845°W		1897	A decorative sign post and lamp post, which has since been altered. It has two round steps, on which is a cast iron post with inscribed plaques. On the top are four decorative directional finger posts, over which are two decorative lamps.	II
War memorial 53.23137°N 0.89774°W		1921	The war memorial is in the churchyard of St Nicholas' Church. It consists of a Latin cross on a tapering hexagonal plinth in dark polished granite, standing on a three-stepped octagonal limestone base surmounted by a black polished granite double plinth and cross. On the upper plinth are an inscription and the names of those lost in the two World Wars, and on the lower plinth are shields in relief with inscriptions.	II
