= Wallingwells =

Hamlet and civil parish in Nottinghamshire, England

Coordinates: 53.35°N 1.14°W

- Hamlet and civil parish
- Location within Nottinghamshire
- Interactive map of Wallingwells
- Area: 0.73 sq mi (1.9 km^{2})
- Population: 27 (2021)
  - Density: 37/sq mi (14/km^{2})
- OS grid reference: SK 572841
  - London: 135 mi (217 km) SSE
- District: Bassetlaw
- Shire county: Nottinghamshire
- Region: East Midlands
- Country: England
- Sovereign state: United Kingdom
- Post town: WORKSOP
- Postcode district: S81
- Dialling code: 01909
- Police: Nottinghamshire
- Fire: Nottinghamshire
- Ambulance: East Midlands
- UK Parliament: Newark

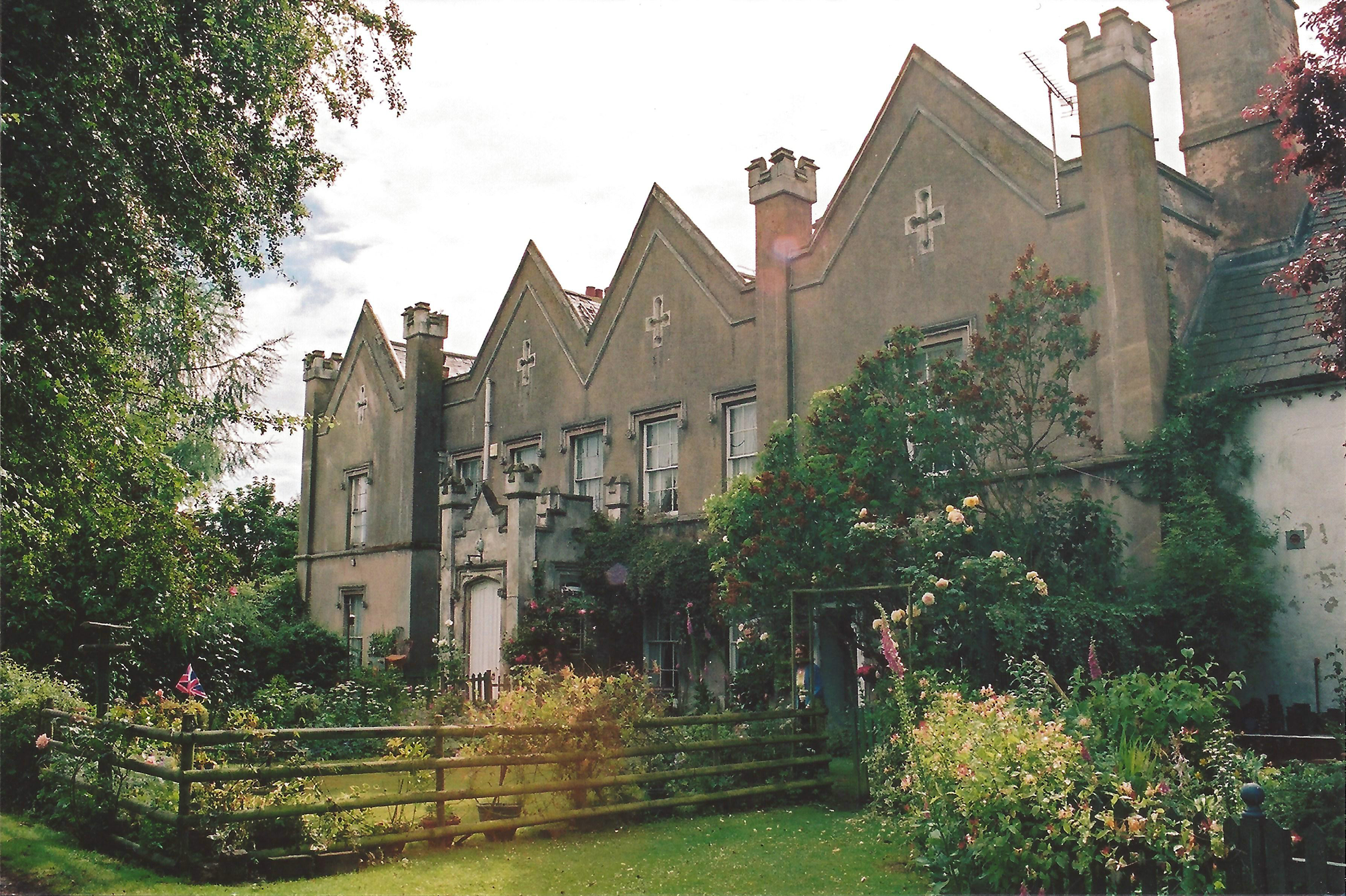
The East Front of Wallingwells Hall (2004)

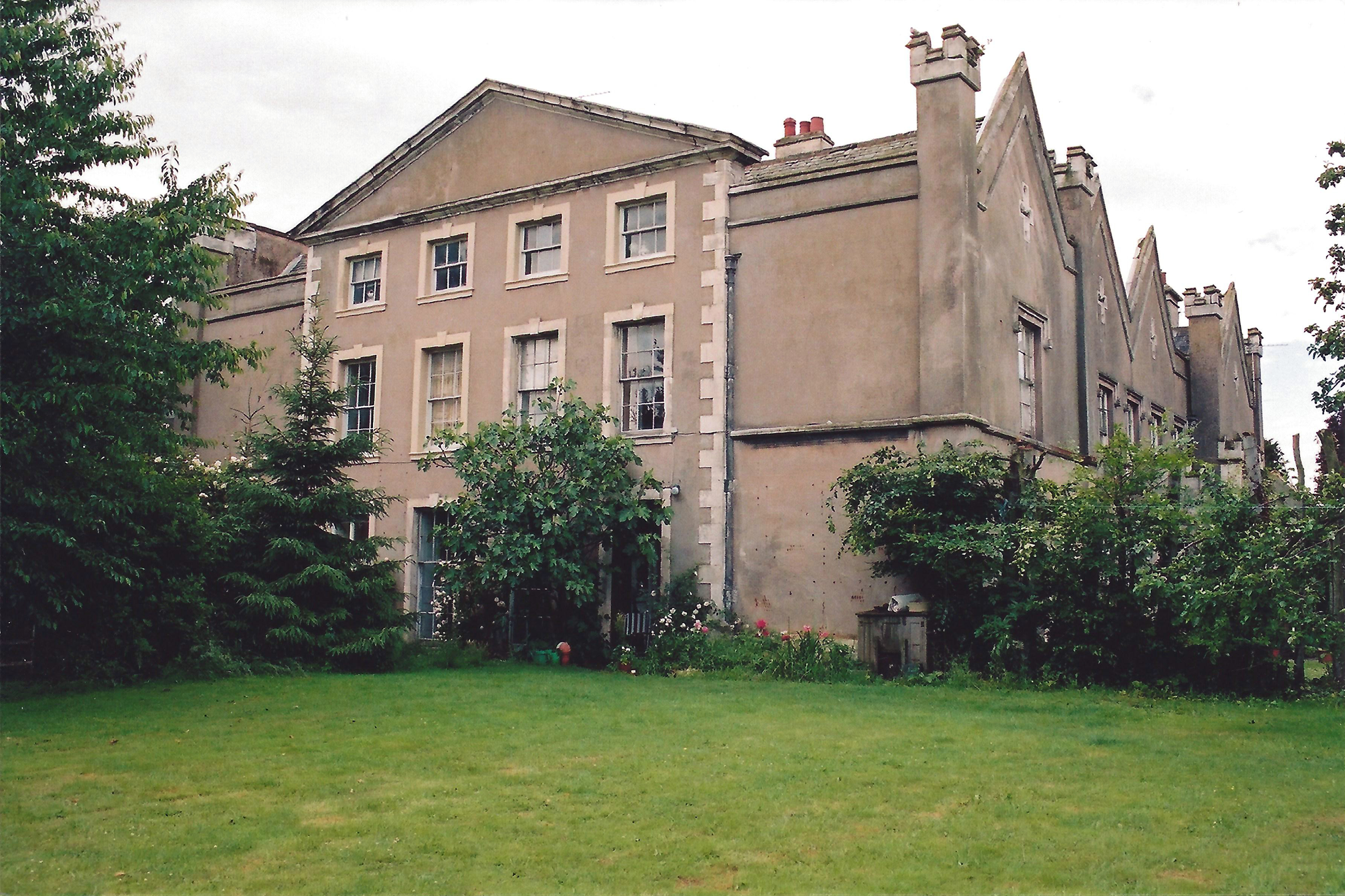
South Front of Wallingwells Hall (2004)

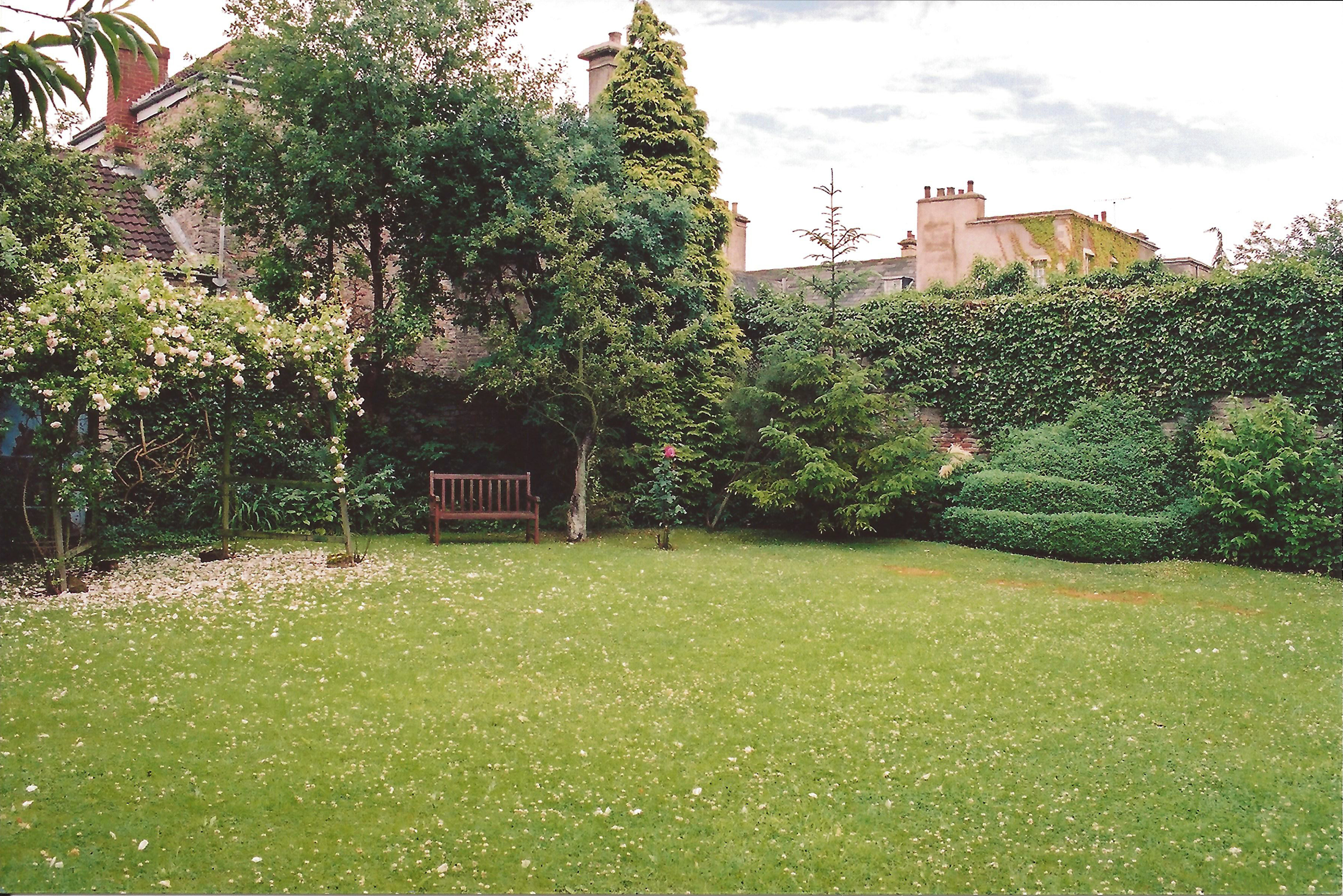
The Walled Garden at Wallingwells Hall (2004)

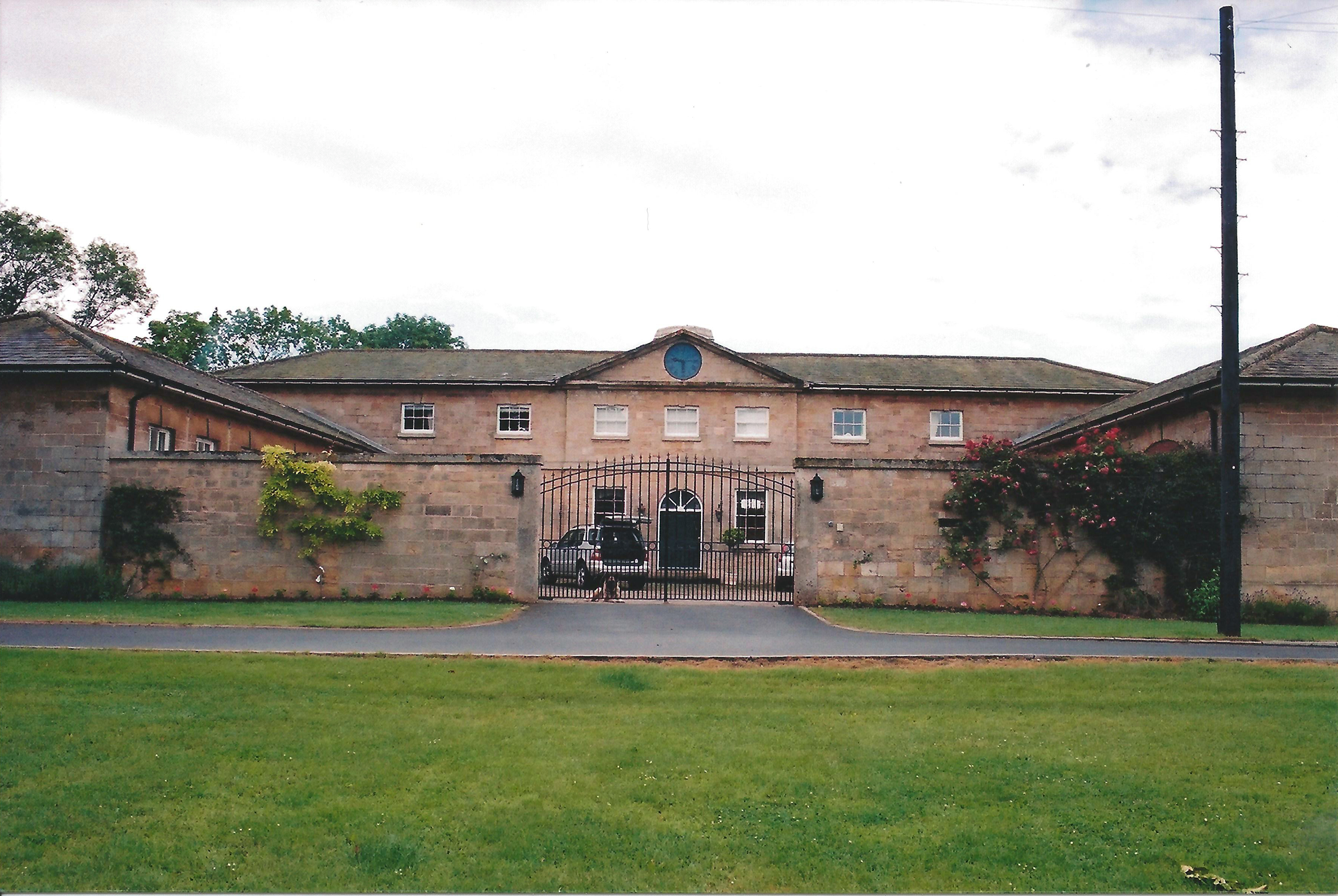
Wallingwells Hall's Stables After Their Conversion into a House (2004)

Wallingwells is a small civil parish and hamlet in the Bassetlaw district of Nottinghamshire, England, with a population at the 2001 census of 22. The population remained less than 100 at the 2011 census, details were included in the civil parish of Carlton in Lindrick. The population was recorded as 27 at the 2021 census. It lies about five miles north of Worksop.

The parish is one of the few in England still to have an exclave – in this case a small section of land separated from the parish by the Carlton in Lindrick parish.

== Wallingwells Hall ==
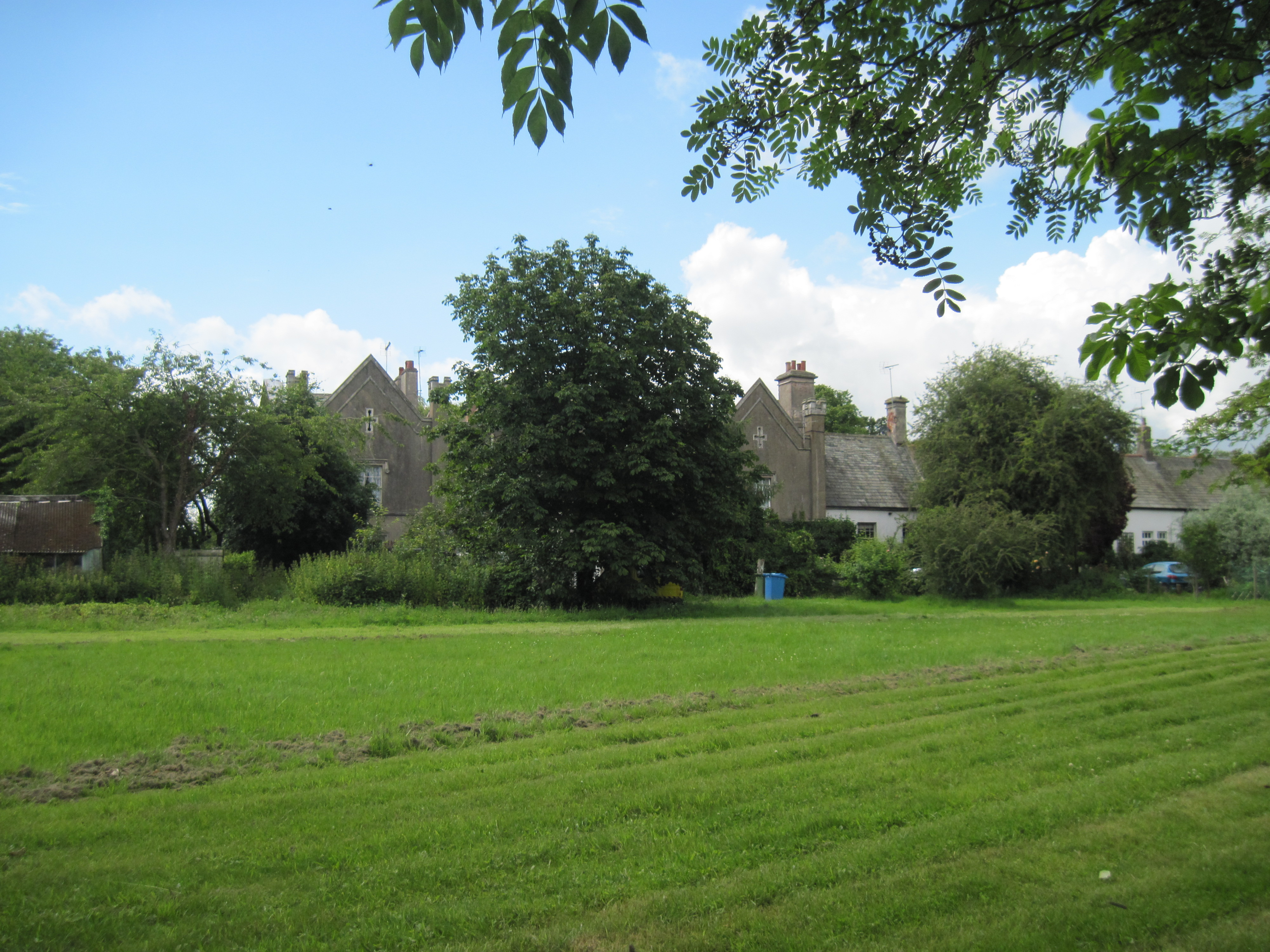
Wallingwells Hall. Now four private houses.

Wallingwells Hall is a grade II listed 17th-century country house built on the site of Wallingwells Priory. It was for several hundred years the seat of the House of White of Tuxford and Wallingwells.

It is constructed of coursed rubble, ashlar, brick and render with slate hipped roofs to an irregular floor plan, and is now divided into four private houses.

== History ==
Wallingwells was granted by Queen Elizabeth I in 1563–1564 to Richard Pype (a leather seller) and Francis Bowyer (a grocer) of London, together with various lands in Wiltshire, and the house built from the ruins of the priory. It was purchased by Major Samuel Taylor in 1698. It passed to his son Richard Taylor, who was High Sheriff of Nottinghamshire for 1689 and MP for East Retford from 1690 to 1698. Richard died in 1699 leaving a sole surviving daughter, Bridget, who had married Thomas White, a wealthy and influential landowner, who owned the manor of Tuxford. The couple decided to make Wallingwells the family seat, keeping Tuxford as the second/dower estate. Thomas White was MP for East Retford for much of the time between 1701 and 1732. He died in 1732 leaving his estates to his eldest son John White, who was also MP for East Retford. John died unmarried and was succeeded by his younger brother, the barrister Taylor White. Taylor had married Sarah Woollaston (heiress of Sir Isaac Woollaston of Lowesby) and their grandson Thomas Woollaston White was created a baronet..

Thomas White was created a baronet by King George III on 20 December 1802 for twice raising, clothing, housing and arming a regiment of militia at the height of the Napoleonic Wars. The regiment was first raised in 1794 as the Sherwood Rangers Yeomanry Cavalry and is still in existence as 'A' Squadron Royal Yeomanry. The 2nd Baronet was High Sheriff of Nottinghamshire for 1833–1834.

Wallingwells was finally sold by the 4th Baronet in 1919 and the main block divided into four separate dwellings in 1926. The adjoining estate offices and servants' wing to the north was also converted into 3 cottages. The stables of Wallingwells were developed into a home in the early 2000s after being derelict since World War I. There is also a private red brick house in the corner of Wallingwells which was built in the 20th century.

Divided into four with three adjoining cottages, it has not changed appreciably. It has three floors, large sash windows, a flat roof at the back, and pitched roofing at the front. The hall has gardens, orchards and woods, and nearby is a private lake. In total the hall has over 20 chimneys, over 50 windows including a glass dome, more than 20 bedrooms, and 7.75 acres of land, now mainly fields and gardens.

== See also ==
- Listed buildings in Wallingwells
