= Taylor White =

British jurist, naturalist, and art collector (1701–1772)

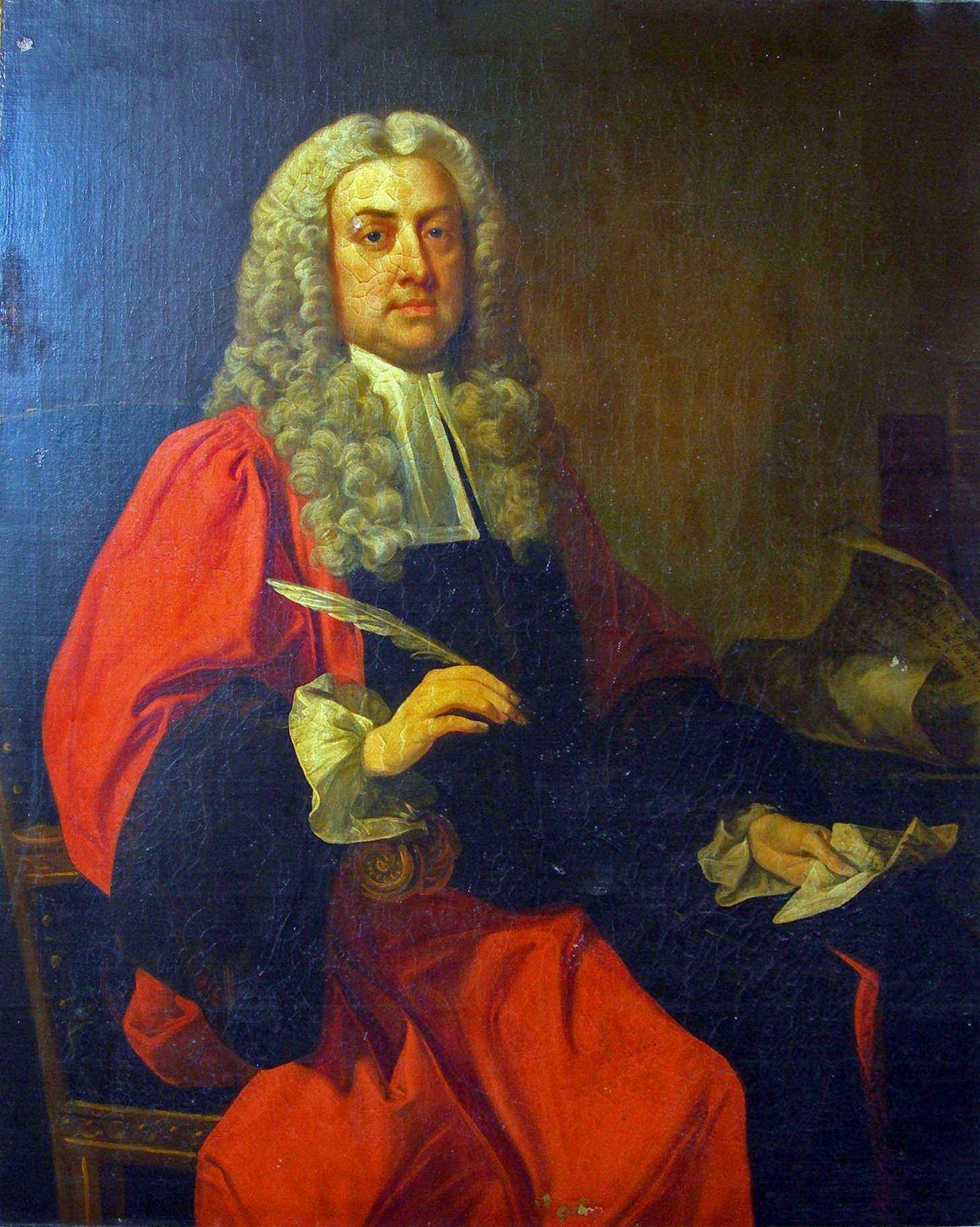
Taylor White (1701–1772) in his robes as Puisne Justice of Chester.

Taylor White FRS (21 December 1701 – 27 March 1772) was a British jurist, naturalist, and art collector. A Fellow of the Royal Society, he was the patron of several prominent wildlife and botanical artists including Peter Paillou, George Edwards, Benjamin Wilkes, and Georg Dionysius Ehret. He was also a founding governor of the Foundling Hospital in London and served as its treasurer for many years.

== Early life and legal career ==
Taylor White was born at his family's seat in Wallingwells, a hamlet in northwest Nottinghamshire. He was one of the five children, and the second son, of Thomas and Bridget (née Taylor) White. His father was for many years the Member of Parliament for East Retford and in 1717 was appointed Clerk of the Ordnance. His maternal grandfather, Richard Taylor, was the High Sheriff of Nottinghamshire and had also served as the Member of Parliament for East Retford. White was admitted to Lincoln's Inn in 1720 where he studied law and was called to the bar in 1727. He practised as a barrister on the Northern Circuit (Yorkshire, Northumberland, Cumberland and Westmoreland) and eventually received several judicial appointments including Circuit Judge on the North Wales Circuit (1750) and Puisne Justice of Chester (1760). In 1737 he had also been one of the four counsels retained by Georgia (then a British colony) in a dispute with its neighbouring colony South Carolina over trade with the Indians.

== The London Foundling Hospital ==
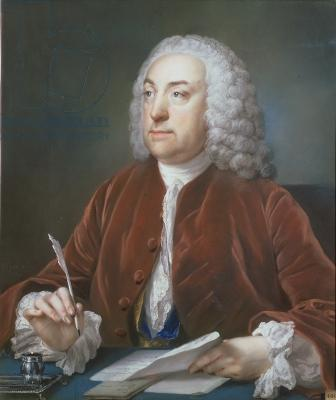
Portrait of Taylor White by Francis Cotes, 1758

A friend and associate of the British philanthropist, Thomas Coram, White worked tirelessly to raise funds enabling the establishment of Coram's Foundling Hospital in 1739. He became one of the founding Governors, and it was in White's London house that the announcement for its first intake of infants was drawn up. Along with Coram and the Duke of Richmond, White and his fellow Governors were present on the evening of 25 March 1741 when the first children arrived. He became a key figure in running the institution, serving as its treasurer from 1745 until his death, and was largely responsible for the establishment of the hospital's branch in Ackworth, West Yorkshire. A portrait by Francis Cotes of White working on his ledgers hung in the Committee Room of the Hospital along with works by William Hogarth and George Lambert, and is now in the care of the Foundling Museum. A keen art collector himself, White was instrumental in building up the hospital's famous art collection, persuading many of the leading artists and collectors of the day to donate works to it. He also commissioned a large marine painting from Charles Brooking for the Committee Room and a painted glass window from William Peckitt for the hospital's chapel.

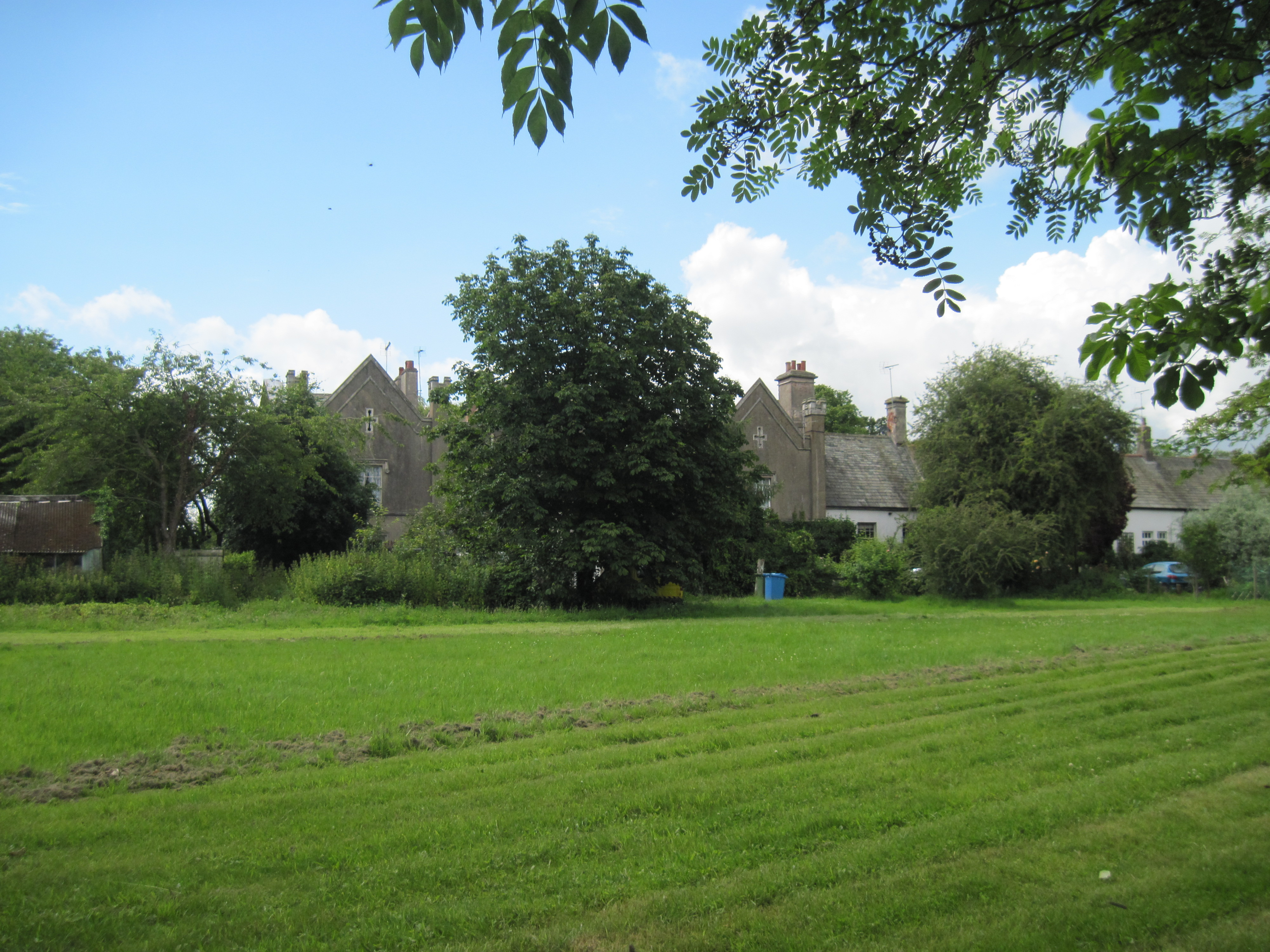
Wallingwells, Nottinghamshire

== Private life ==
He succeeded his unmarried elder brother John White to the substantial family estates, including Wallingwells, in 1769.

Taylor married Anne, daughter of Thomas Errington on 1 May 1729. She died just seventeen months later in October 1730, leaving no children.

On 18 September 1739 he remarried. His new bride was Frances, the third daughter of Major-General John Armstrong. Armstrong was the 1st Duke of Marlborough's right-hand man during his campaigns. He was the Surveyor-General of the Ordnance, Chief Engineer of England, Quartermaster-General, Colonel of the Royal Regiment of Foot, and Governor of the Tower of London.

Taylor and Frances's children were:

1. John (28 September 1740 – 10 August 1752); he died of a cold caught at school at Hackney, and was buried in the Tower of London.
2. Anne (6 April 1742 – 18 June 1819); died aged 77.
3. Taylor (5 November 1743 – 20 July 1795).
4. Frances (2 July 1745 – 21 May 1806); died at her house in Worksop, Nottinghamshire, unmarried, and was buried at Tuxford.
5. Thomas (4 May 1747 – 19 February 1786); died at Bath and is buried in the choir of the Abbey Church. He never married.
6. Mary (27 August 1748 – 1750); buried in the Tower of London.
7. Stephen (14 January 1750 – 30 September 1824); he was ancestor of the Whites of Castor, Northants.
8. John (23 October 1755 – 11 August 1762); buried in the Tower of London.

Taylor White died on 27 March 1772 and was buried in the family church in Tuxford.

== Legacy ==
White's collection of 938 watercolour paintings of mammals, birds, fish, and reptiles is now in the McGill University Library, which has made digital scans available online.

Legal offices
| Preceded by John Talbot | Puisne Justice of Chester; 1756–1771 | Succeeded by John Skynner |
