= Listed buildings in Wallingwells =

Wallingwells is a civil parish in the Bassetlaw District of Nottinghamshire, England. The parish contains seven listed buildings that are recorded in the National Heritage List for England. All the listed buildings are designated at Grade II, the lowest of the three grades, which is applied to "buildings of national importance and special interest". The parish contains the country house, Wallingwells Hall, which is listed. All the other listed buildings are in the gardens or grounds of the hall, and include ancillary buildings, formal gardens, a pair of gate piers, and a grotto.

== Buildings ==
Name and location	Photograph	Date	Notes
Wallingwells Hall and service wing 53.35097°N 1.14143°W		17th century	A country house that has been altered and extended, and later converted into apartments. It is in stone and brick, partly rendered, it has slate roofs with coped gables, and an irregular plan. There are two storeys and an east front of seven bays, the outer bays projecting and gabled, outside which are embattled square turrets. In the centre is a porch with embattled turrets and a shaped gable, containing a doorway with a Tudor arch and a hood mould. The windows are sashes with hood moulds, and all the gables on the front contain a cross pattern arrow loop. The south front has six bays, the middle four bays projecting slightly under a pediment and flanked by quoins. The sash windows have stone surrounds and keystones, and the outer bays contain recessed porches. To the right of the east front, the former service wing has been divided into three cottages. There is a single storey and an attic, and ten bays.
Castle Garden and Kitchen Gardens, Wallingwells Hall; 53.35446°N 1.14468°W	—	Mid 18th century	The garden wall is in stone with a quadrilateral plan, four projecting pavilions at the corners, and an embattled wall to the north, east and west. The northeast and northwest pavilions have a single storey and a pointed arched entrance. The other pavilions are embattled, the southeast one with three storeys and pointed arches, the southwest one with two storeys and an arch with a moulded surround and engaged columns with capitals. The kitchen garden has three walls.
Grotto and wall, Wallingwells Hall; 53.35327°N 1.14287°W	—	Mid 18th century	The grotto is built with rough hewn rocks and some brick, with a circular plan. There is a central blocked arched flanked by walls, and on the lake side is an arch with a pendant keystone. The interior is domed, and contains five niches with keystones and voussoirs. Flanking the entrance are retaining walls.
Stables, wall, courtyard and kennels, Wallingwells Hall; 53.35192°N 1.14180°W		Mid 18th century	The stables are in stone and form a quadrangle plan. The north range has two storeys and seven bays, the middle three bays projecting under a pediment containing a clock face, and an arched doorway with a keystone. The windows on the front are sashes with splayed lintels. Projecting from the ends are single-storey seven-bay wings, the east wing containing three large carriage entrances. The courtyard, which is paved, is closed by a coped stone wall containing double wooden gates. Projecting from the rear is a lean-to, and projecting from this is a stone wall with triangular coping and iron railings.
Cartshed, Wallingwells Hall; 53.35206°N 1.14205°W	—	Late 18th century	The cartshed is in stone, with the remains of an eaves band, and a hipped pantile roof. There is a single storey, five bays, and a recessed lean-to on the left. In the centre is an archway with a rusticated surround, flanked by arches with imposts and keystones.
Gate piers, Wallingwells Hall; 53.35073°N 1.14112°W	—	Late 18th century]	The pair of gate piers is in the garden of the hall. They are in stone, and are rusticated and coped.
Walled garden, Wallingwells Hall; 53.35128°N 1.14177°W	—	Undated	The garden, which has a quadrangle plan, is enclosed by stone wall with quoins and coping. On the east side is a doorway with a keystone, in the southwest corner is a lean-to, and the east wall has a stone block with decorative moulding.
