= Ruth Follows =

English Quaker

Ruth Follows nee Alcock (1718–1809), was an English Quaker.

Follows, born in 1718 at Weston in Nottinghamshire, was the daughter of Richard and Ruth Alcock, who were poor quakers. When twenty-three years old she married George Follows, Quaker, of Castle Donington in Leicestershire, with whom she lived sixty years, and by whom she had two children. When about thirty years of age she received a certificate enabling her to travel as a minister, and visited and preached at the majority of the Quaker meetings in the United Kingdom. Her first sermon was preached in 1748 at Castle Donington, whence she proceeded to London, attending over eighty meetings on her way. She remained in London until the middle of 1749, from which time until 1758 she appears to have done little more than attend to meetings in the neighbourhood of her own residence, and those at Atherstone and Matlock.

In 1758 she visited Yorkshire and Lancashire, and in 1760 made an extended tour, which embraced most of the meetings in the western and midland counties, as well as London and Norfolk. During the following year she visited Ireland, where she remained several months, working so arduously as to seriously injure her health. Quakerism was at this time at a low ebb in Ireland, and her letters show that she was greatly dispirited. In 1764 she laboured in Wales, and between that time and 1788 she visited nearly every part of England and Wales, and made several excursions into Scotland. In 1782–3 she spent several months in ministerial work in Ireland. From 1788 until her death she was almost incapacitated by the infirmities of age; but she was able to make occasional journeys, the last she undertook being in 1795, when seventy-seven years old. She died on 3 April 1809, and was buried seven days later in the Quaker burial-ground at Castle Donington. She is not known to have been the author of any works. Her life was very self-denying and her intense piety, her ministry being highly valued for its simplicity and earnestness.
