= Wallingwells Priory =

Wallingwells Priory was a small house of Benedictine nuns founded in the 1140s by Ralph de Chevrolcourt at Wallingwells on land he had donated near Carlton in Lindrick, Nottinghamshire.

The priory was surrendered to the Crown as part of the Dissolution of the Monasteries on 14 December 1539, after which a pension of £6 was assigned to Margaret Goldsmith the last prioress, and of 53s. 4d. each to Anne Roden the sub-prioress and Elizabeth Kirkby and of 40s. each to the six other nuns.

At its dissolution, The Priory was valued at £59 (equivalent to £50,000 in 2023),and was granted by Queen Elizabeth I to Richard Pype and Francis Bowyer; it was later the property of the Taylor and White families. A country house known as Wallingwells Hall was built on the site using materials retrieved from the priory.

== Prioresses of Wallingwells ==
- Margery Dourant (temp Richard I)
- Emma de Stockwell, appointed November 1295 by Archbishop Romayne
- Dionysia, resigned 1325
- Alice de Sheffield, resigned 1353
- Helen de Bolsover, resigned 1402
- Isabel de Durham, 1402
- Joan Hewet, died 1465
- Elizabeth Wilcocks, 1465
- Elizabeth Kirkby, 1504
- Isabel Croft, 1508–11
- Anne Goldsmith, 1516
- Margaret Goldsmith, 1521
