= Sir Robert Clifton, 5th Baronet =

British politician

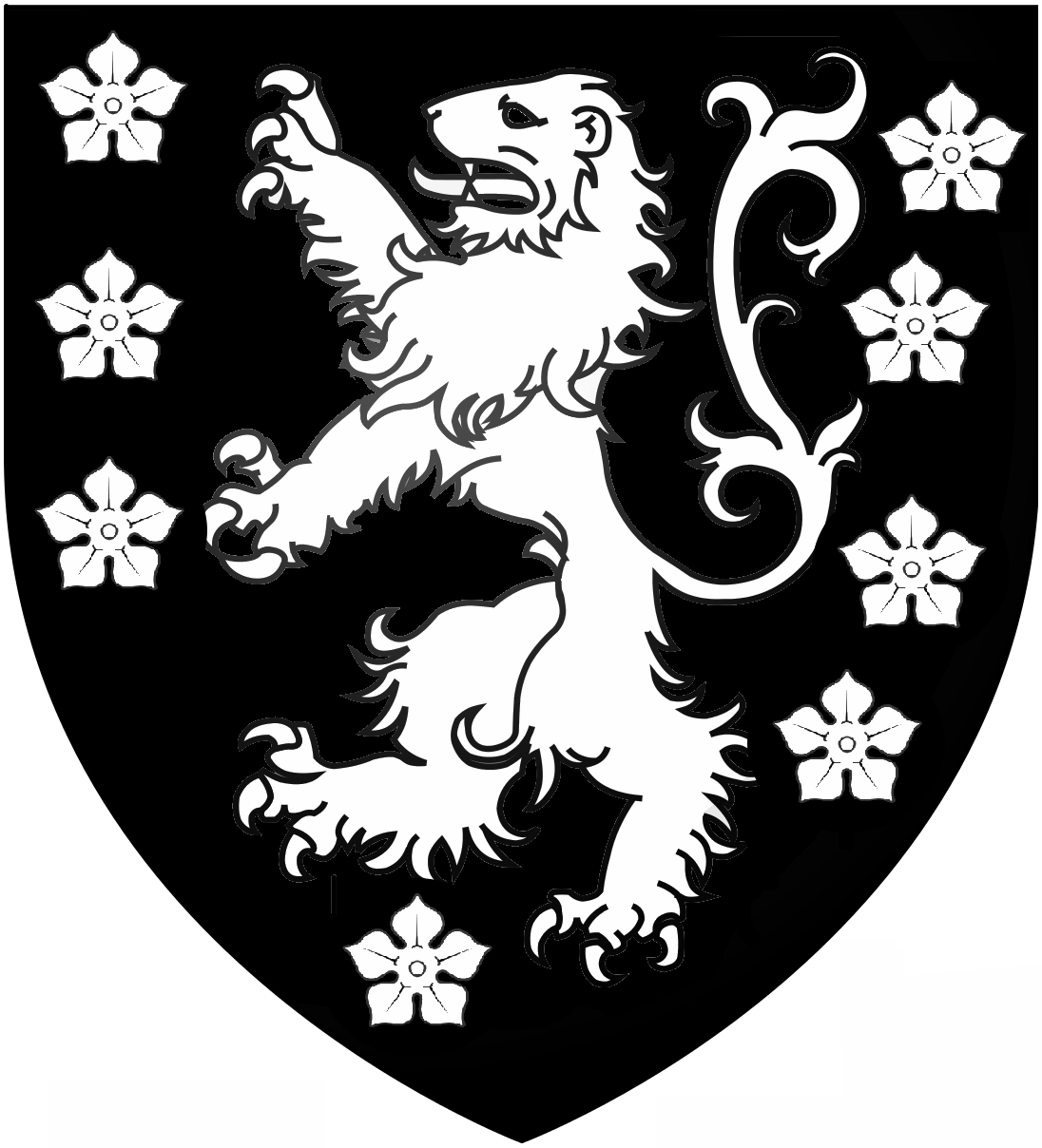
Arms of Clifton of Clifton, Nottinghamshire (Clifton Baronets): Sable semée of cinquefoils and a lion rampant argent

Sir Robert Clifton, 5th Baronet (1690–1762) KB of Clifton Hall, Nottingham was a British politician who sat in the House of Commons from 1727 to 1741.

== Early life ==
Clifton was the eldest son of Sir Gervase Clifton, 4th Baronet, and his wife Anne Bagnall, daughter of Dudley Bagnall of Newry, Ireland. He was imprisoned briefly with his father during the Jacobite Rising of 1715. He married on 27 June 1723, Frances Coote, daughter of Nanfan Coote, 2nd Earl of Bellomont. On 27 May 1725, he was made a Knight of the Bath.

== Career ==
At the 1727 British general election Clifton planned to stand for both East Retford and Nottinghamshire with combined Whig and Tory support, but reached a compromise by which he was assured of support at East Retford where he was returned as Member of Parliament. He supported the Government, serving on the gaols committee of the House of Commons. In 1731, he succeeded his father to the baronetcy. He was returned unopposed at the 1734 British general election. He carried on supporting the Government until 1737 when he voted for an increase in the Prince of Wales's allowance. After that he acted with the Opposition. His first wife Frances had died in 1733 and he married on 16 October 1739, Hannah Lombe daughter of Sir Thomas Lombe, Alderman and Sheriff of London and his wife Elizabeth Turner. In a contest for East Retford at the 1741 British general election, he came bottom of the poll, despite large bribes paid by his mother-in-law, Lady Lombe, to potential voters.

According to Lord Egmont, Clifton separated from his wife and took up with his mother-in-law, both of them behaving so extravagantly that in 1746 he was imprisoned for debt. His second wife Hannah died in 1748. He expressed interest in standing for parliament again, but found little support in his attempts to stand at East Retford in 1747 and Nottingham in 1758. In 1756, he married as his third wife Judith Thwaites, daughter of Captain Thwaites.

== Death and legacy ==
Clifton died on 7 December 1762. By his first wife Frances he had a daughter Frances Clifton, who married in 1747 George Carpenter, 1st Earl of Tyrconnell. By his second wife had a son Gervase who succeeded to the baronetcy. His third wife died in 1765.

Parliament of Great Britain
Preceded by Thomas White; Patrick Chaworth	Member of Parliament for 1727–1741; With: Thomas White 1727-1733; John White 1733-1741	Succeeded by John White; William Mellish
Baronetage of England
Preceded by Gervase Clifton	Baronet (of Clifton, Nottinghamshire); 1731–1762	Succeeded by Gervase Clifton
