= Listed buildings in Weston, Nottinghamshire =

Weston is a civil parish in the Newark and Sherwood district of Nottinghamshire, England. The parish contains six listed buildings that are recorded in the National Heritage List for England. Of these, one is listed at Grade I, the highest of the three grades, and the others are at Grade II, the lowest grade. The parish contains the village of Weston and the surrounding countryside, and the listed buildings consist of a church, a sundial in the churchyard, houses and farmhouses and associated structures.

== Key ==
Grade	Criteria
I	Buildings of exceptional interest, sometimes considered to be internationally important
II	Buildings of national importance and special interest

== Buildings ==
Name and location	Photograph	Date	Notes	Grade
All Saints' Church; 53.20361°N 0.84248°W		13th century	The church has been altered and extended through the centuries, including a repair in 1768, and restorations in 1840 and 1880. It is built in stone, with roofs of slab and lead, and consists of a nave with a clerestory, north and south aisles, a south porch, a chancel and a west steeple. The steeple has a tower with two stages, a string course, lancet windows, a south clock face, two-light bell openings with cusped ogee heads and hood moulds, a decorated eaves band with four gargoyles, an embattled parapet, and a recessed octagonal spire with a finial and a weathercock. There are also embattled parapets on the nave and the chancel, with crocketed pinnacles on the nave.	I
Scarthingmoor House; 53.21018°N 0.85635°W		18th century	The farmhouse, at one time a public house, was extended during the 19th century. It is in rendered brick on a stone plinth, with rebated eaves and slate roofs. There are three storeys, a south front of two bays, and a rear wing. In the centre of the front is a porch with columns, antae and a parapet, and the windows are sashes. At the rear is a stepped gable and a round-headed doorway with a fanlight. On the right is a ramped and coped boundary wall, and a single-storey two-bay toilet block.	II
Sundial; 53.20325°N 0.84241°W		1795	The sundial in the churchyard of All Saints' Church is on the base of the former village cross. It is in stone, and has a tapering octagonal shaft, and a brass dial inscribed with initials and the date.	II
Scarthingmoor Mill Farmhouse; 53.21124°N 0.86319°W	—	c. 1810	The farmhouse is in brick on a plinth, with a floor band, an eaves band and a hipped pantile roof. There are two storeys, three bays, and rear additions. The middle bay of the northeast front is pedimented, to the left is a porch, and the windows are horizontally-sliding sashes with rubbed brick heads. On the west side and at the rear are casement windows, and at the rear is a gabled dormer.	II
Dovecote House and pigeoncote 53.20300°N 0.84372°W		Early 19th century	The house is in brick with a floor band, dentilled eaves and a tile roof. There are two storeys, an L-shaped plan, a front of three bays, and a rear lean-to. The central doorway and the windows on the front, which are sashes, have segmental heads, and elsewhere there are casement windows. The pigeoncote at the rear has a casement window and a doorway, both with segmental heads, and two tiers of pigeonholes. Inside there are wattle and daub nest boxes.	II
Stable and Pigeoncote, Sunnyside Farm; 53.20340°N 0.83959°W	—	Early 19th century	The stable and pigeoncote are in brick, with dentilled eaves, and a pantile roof with a plain tile ridge, coped gables and kneelers. The stable has a single storey and two bays, and contains a stable door and casement windows, and the pigeoncote has a single bay and two storeys, and contains a stable door, above which is a pigeonhole with a segmental head.	II
