= Henry Pelham-Clinton, 4th Duke of Newcastle =

British nobleman and politician

His Grace The Duke of Newcastle KG
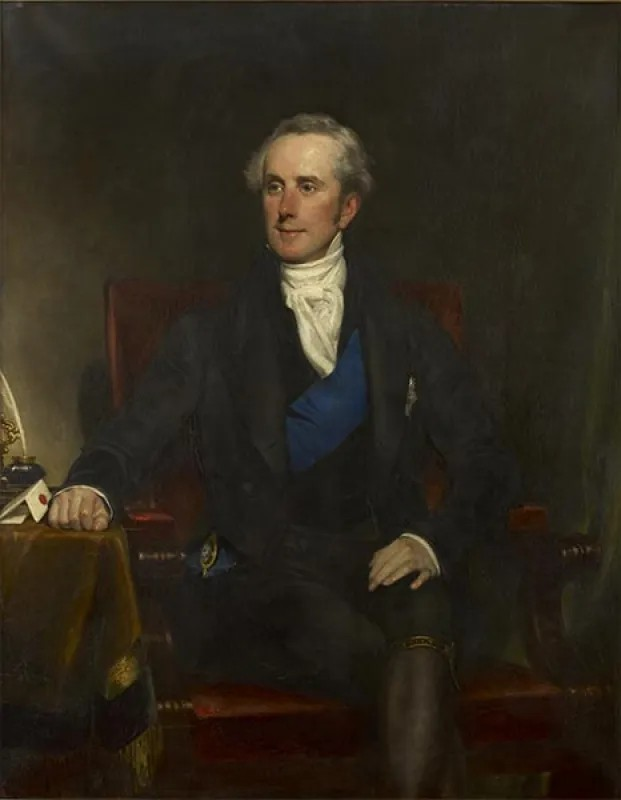
- Portrait by Henry William Pickersgill, 1835

Lord Lieutenant of Nottinghamshire
- In office 1809–1839
- Preceded by: The Duke of Portland
- Succeeded by: The Earl of Scarbrough

Member of the House of Lords
- Lord Temporal
- In office 18 May 1795 – 12 January 1851
- Preceded by: The 3rd Duke of Newcastle
- Succeeded by: The 5th Duke of Newcastle

Personal details
- Born: Henry Pelham Fiennes Pelham-Clinton; 31 January 1785
- Died: 12 January 1851 (aged 65) Clumber Park
- Resting place: All Saints' Church, West Markham
- Spouse: Georgiana Elizabeth Mundy (m. 1807; died 1822)
- Children: Lady Anna Maria Pelham-Clinton; Lady Georgiana Pelham-Clinton; Henry Pelham-Clinton, 5th Duke of Newcastle; Lady Charlotte Pelham-Clinton; Lord Charles Clinton; Lord Thomas Charles Pelham-Clinton; Lord William Pelham-Clinton; Lord Edward Pelham-Clinton; Lord John Pelham-Clinton; Lady Caroline Augusta Ricketts; Lady Henrietta D'Eyncourt; Lord Robert Pelham-Clinton; Lord George Pelham Clinton
- Parent(s): Thomas Pelham-Clinton, 3rd Duke of Newcastle; Lady Anna Maria Stanhope
- Education: Eton College

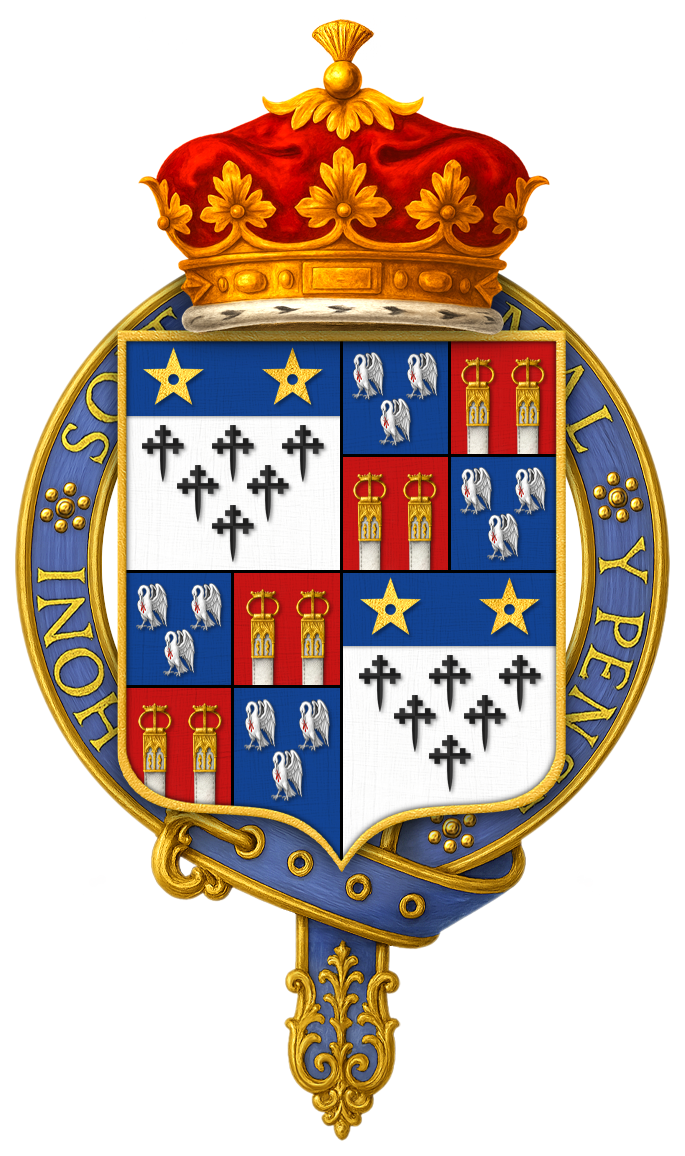
Quartered arms of Henry Pelham-Clinton, 4th Duke of Newcastle

Henry Pelham Fiennes Pelham-Clinton, 4th Duke of Newcastle-under-Lyne (31 January 1785 – 12 January 1851), was a British nobleman and politician who played a leading part in British politics in the late 1820s and early 1830s. He was styled Lord Clinton from birth until 1794 and Earl of Lincoln between 1794 and 1795.

== Early life ==
Pelham-Clinton was the eldest son of Thomas Pelham-Clinton, 3rd Duke of Newcastle, and his wife Lady Anna Maria (née Stanhope), and was educated at Eton College. His father died when he was ten years old. In 1803, encouraged by the Peace of Amiens which provided a break in hostilities with France, his mother and stepfather took him on a European Tour. Unfortunately, war broke out once again, and the young duke was detained at Tours in 1803, where he remained until 1806.

== Career ==
On his return to England in 1807, Pelham-Clinton embarked upon life with many personal advantages, and with a considerable fortune. He married at Lambeth, on 18 July 1807, a great heiress, Georgiana Elizabeth, daughter of Edward Miller Mundy of Shipley, Derbyshire. He served as Lord Lieutenant of Nottinghamshire from 1809 to 1839 and was also Steward of Sherwood Forest and of Folewood Park. In 1812 he was made a Knight of the Garter.

=== Opposition to Catholic Emancipation ===
On 22 March 1821, Newcastle published a pamphlet in the form of a letter to Lord Liverpool, protesting against a Bill for Catholic Emancipation. Newcastle argued that if his government supported Emancipation they would be doing the country an injustice for two main reasons. Firstly, the attention of the nation was preoccupied with domestic problems and little interested in the question, so to pass Emancipation now would be a betrayal. Secondly, the government could not be neutral on this question because if the Bill passed Parliament, the King would have to refuse Royal Assent as it would be in breach of his promise, made in the Coronation Oath, to uphold the Protestant constitution. If the King were to do this without the advice of his ministers then it would be unconstitutional since the King could only act on the advice of his ministers. Thereby the government should adopt a position on the question, and this position should, of necessity, be opposed to Emancipation.

He did not hold any national office but he was extremely active in politics. From about 1826 he became one of the leaders of the so-called "Ultra-Tory" faction, staunchly supporting the traditional establishment of Church, Country and State. He rejected the label of Tory, however.

On 13 March 1827, Newcastle told Lord Colchester that he wanted to form a group to support the King in forming a government opposed to Emancipation with the aid of Lord Mansfield, Lord Salisbury and Lord Falmouth, and that he could win the support of about 60 peers. On 24 March Newcastle had an audience with the King, George IV, on the question of Emancipation. However early in the conversation, the King interrupted Newcastle, "it was only occasionally that I could edge in my remarks & opinions". Newcastle said himself and other peers' wishes for an administration "formed on anti-Rom. Cath. principles & that if it would be H.M.'s pleasure to form such an administration it would be certain of support & success". The King, however, said a Prime Minister could not be appointed until it was certain that Lord Liverpool would not recover from his stroke.

Newcastle responded by saying this delay could only help the pro-Emancipation politicians and that he and other peers would help the King in his choice if he would choose Protestants, "not doubtful Protestants but such as are staunch and unequivocal in their opinions". The King replied: "That you may safely rely upon". When Newcastle was going to suggest Lord Eldon as Prime Minister, the King stopped him by saying Eldon was persona non-grata and suggested Wellington instead. Newcastle was opposed to this choice and wanted the King to make a stronger declaration in favour of a government opposed to Emancipation. The King was annoyed at this and asked, "What more can I do?" Newcastle said nothing could be better than his declaration and that if he had the permission to make the King's declaration publicly known. The King would not allow this, however.

Newcastle wrote to Lord Colchester on 15 January 1828, that he wanted "a sound, plain-dealing Protestant administration, devoid of all quackery and mysterious nonsense". The Duke of Wellington sought Newcastle's support for his new government, and when he learnt that it did not possess Newcastle's confidence (and not receiving a reply to his first letter) he wrote again to him on 31 January, saying: "Nothing can be more unpleasant to me than that the friendly Relations between your Grace and the Govt. should be suspended". Newcastle finally replied on 4 February, saying his government did not possess his confidence.

On 18 September 1828, Newcastle condemned the government for "neutrality, conciliation, and modern liberality". Wellington "may be the victim of a monstrous error" but he had supported relieving the Dissenters and his first parliamentary session was "by far the most disastrous of any in the memory of man". Newcastle advised that those opposed to Emancipation "must unite in Protestant associations from one end of the country to the other, and as Parliament is not sitting, they should address their Protestant King". Failure to do this might provoke punishment from God.

Newcastle led a crowd to Windsor to petition the King against Emancipation. One contemporary Canningite called it "radical all over".

After his friend Lord Winchilsea duelled with the Duke of Wellington in March 1829, Newcastle wrote in his journal " Lord Falmouth (Winchilsea's second) gave me an account of the duel, He says the Duke of Wellington behaved in a very churlish, overbearing manner, and when the affair was over did not shake hands, and departed sulkily. One is almost tempted to wish that a life so dangerous (the Duke's life) had been taken away, but one must not indulge in such unchristian feelings.... The Duke of Wellington's time may not yet be come, but it may, and that shortly, for assuredly he is a villain"

When in October 1829, Newcastle was criticised for evicting tenants who had voted against his candidates, he famously wrote: "Is it presumed then that I am not to do what I will with my own?". He repeated this in the Lords on 3 December 1830. In response to further evictions, The Times rebuked Newcastle for acting like the recently deposed Charles X of France in abusing his power and claimed that his actions were the best argument in favour of reform.

=== Opposition to Reform ===
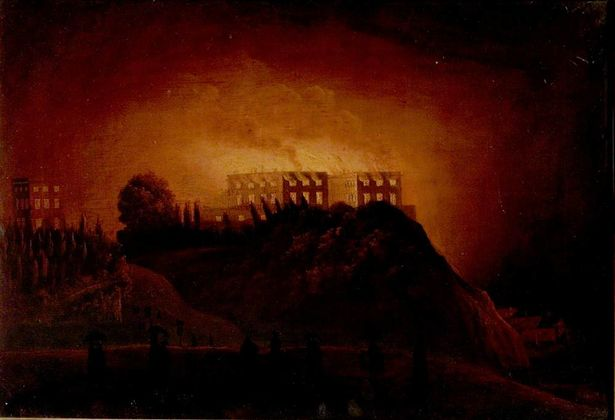
Nottingham Castle on Fire by Henry Dawson, 1831

Pelham-Clinton was a vehement opponent of electoral reform. This stance led to attacks on his property during the Reform Bill Riots of 1831. Nottingham Castle was burnt to the ground and his residences at Clumber Park, Nottinghamshire, and Portman Square, London, also had to be fortified against the mob.

In 1839, Newcastle objected to the appointment to the magistracy of two gentlemen nominated by the government, but of whose political and religious principles he disapproved (being Dissenters).

He wrote a very offensive letter to Lord Chancellor Cottenham, and on his refusing to withdraw it he received a letter on 4 May from Russell informing him that the Queen had no further occasion for his services as Lord Lieutenant of Nottinghamshire. Charles Greville wrote in his diary on 2 May:

I met the Duke of Wellington at the Ancient Concert, and asked him the reason, which he told me in these words: "Oh, there never was such a fool, as he is; the Government have done quite right, quite right, they could not do otherwise".

== Personal life ==
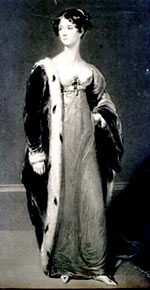
Georgiana Elizabeth Duchess, after Thomas Lawrence.

On 18 July 1807 Pelham-Clinton married Georgiana Elizabeth, the only child and heiress of Edward Miller Mundy of Shipley Hall, and his second wife, Georgiana (née Chadwick) Willoughby (the former wife of Thomas Willoughby, 4th Baron Middleton and second daughter of Evelyn Chadwick of West Leake). They had eight sons and six daughters, including:

- Lady Anna Maria Pelham-Clinton (1808–1822)
- Lady Georgiana Pelham-Clinton (1810–1874)
- Henry Pelham-Clinton, 5th Duke of Newcastle (1811–1864), who married Lady Susan Hamilton, the only daughter of Alexander Hamilton, 10th Duke of Hamilton, and Susan Beckford (second daughter and co-heiress of William Beckford of Fonthill Abbey), in 1832. They divorced in August 1850 and she married Jean Opdebeck of Brussels in January 1860.
- Lady Charlotte Pelham-Clinton (1812–1886)
- Lord Charles Pelham Pelham-Clinton (1813–1894), who married Elizabeth Grant, only surviving child of William Grant of Congleton, in 1848.
- Lord Thomas Charles Pelham-Clinton (1813–1882), who married Marianne Gritton, a daughter of Francis Gritton, in 1843; they separated in 1865.
- Lord William Pelham-Clinton (1815–1850), who died unmarried.
- Lt. Lord Edward Pelham-Clinton (1816–1842), who died of illness aboard HMS Harlequin during the First Opium War.
- Lord John Pelham-Clinton (1817–1817), who died in infancy.
- Lady Caroline Augusta Pelham-Clinton (1818–1898), who married Sir Cornwallis Ricketts, 2nd Baronet, in 1852.
- Lady Henrietta Pelham-Clinton (1819–1890), who married Admiral Edwin Tennyson-d'Eyncourt of Bayons Manor in 1859.
- Lord Robert Renebald Pelham-Clinton (1820–1867), who died unmarried.

The Duchess of Newcastle-under-Lyne died in 1822 while giving birth to twins, a stillborn daughter and a son, Lord George Pelham Clinton, who died 13 days after birth. In memory of her, the 4th Duke built a church and mausoleum at Milton, Nottinghamshire. In 1833, when the new church at Milton was finished, it became the parish church, replacing the old one at West Markham. This situation was reversed, however, in 1949 when All Saints, West Markham, was reinstated as the parish church, and the Duke's mausoleum was left to decay. Milton Church, now simply a mausoleum, was finally rescued in 1972 when the Churches Conservation Trust took it into guardianship.

The 4th Duke never remarried before his death at Clumber Park, Nottinghamshire, 12 January 1851, and was buried in All Saints' Church, West Markham, on 21 January. He was succeeded by his eldest son Henry, who was a prominent politician.

=== Legacy ===
The papers of the 4th Duke, including his very detailed personal diaries for the period 1822–1851, are now held by Manuscripts and Special Collections at the University of Nottingham.

== Works ==
- Letter of the Duke of Newcastle to Lord Kenyon on the Catholic Emancipation Question (1828).
- An Address to all classes and conditions of Englishmen (1832).
- Thoughts in times past tested by subsequent events (1837).

== Coat of arms ==
Coat of arms of Henry Pelham-Clinton, 4th Duke of Newcastle
| Coronet A coronet of an Duke Crest 1st, out of a ducal coronet gules, a plume of five ostrich feathers argent, banded azure; 2nd, a peacock in pride proper. Escutcheon Quarterly: 1st and 4th argent, six cross crosslets, three, two and one, sable, on a chief azure two mullets pierced gules (Clinton); 2nd and 3rd, quarterly, 1st and 4th azure, three pelicans vulning themselves argent; and 2nd and 3rd gules, two pieces of belts with buckles erect in pale, the buckles upwards argent (Pelham). Supporters Two greyhounds argent collared and lined gules. Motto Loyaulté n'a honte Loyalty knows not shame |

== Notes ==
Attribution

This article incorporates text from a publication now in the public domain: Boase, George Clement (1887). "Clinton, Henry Pelham Fiennes Pelham (1785-1851)". In Stephen, Leslie (ed.). Dictionary of National Biography. Vol. 11. London: Smith, Elder & Co. p. 98.

Honorary titles
| Preceded by The Duke of Portland | Lord Lieutenant of Nottinghamshire; 1809–1839 | Succeeded by The Earl of Scarbrough |
Peerage of Great Britain
| Preceded by Thomas Pelham-Clinton | Duke of Newcastle; 1795–1851; Member of the House of Lords (1795–1851) | Succeeded by Henry Pelham-Clinton |
