= Thomas White of Tuxford =

Thomas White (died 1580) was an English state official who came to prominence during the Dudley conspiracy of 1555 against Mary I of England. (Note: His name is also spelt Thomas Whyte.)

== Biography ==
He was the son of John White. He lived in Tuxford in Nottinghamshire. Thomas married Agnes (aka Anne) Cecil, the daughter of Richard Cecil. Agnes' brother was Queen Elizabeth I's great Lord Treasurer, Sir William Cecil, 1st Lord Burghley).

During the plot, Sir Henry Dudley, a kinsman of the Duke of Northumberland, tried to place Princess Elizabeth on the throne of England, disposing of Mary. Thomas White was an official in the Exchequer. His part in the plot was to have been a minor one whereby he was to have arrange the robbery of the Exchequer to provide finance for the plotters to pay for the army of exiles and mercenaries they were attempting to bring over from the Continent. White became frightened as time went on, and confessed to Cardinal Pole all he knew. The plot was foiled. As a reward for his loyalty, White was rewarded by the gracious gift of four estates from the Queen. The estates were: Cotgrave, Notts., and Preston, Stone, and Kynwadeston, in Somerset. "In consideration," so runs the Originalia Roll, 3 and 4 Phil, and Mary, "of good and faithful service by our beloved servant, Thomas White, gentleman, in that late conspiracy against us, our crown and dignity attempted not long since by Henry Dudley and his accomplices." Thomas’s wife is called Agnes Cecil throughout this grant.

In addition to these manors and his Collingham property, Thomas possessed the manor of Ruddingston, Notts.; lands at Holbich, Lincoln; Stilton, Hunts.; and the estate of Woodhead, in Rutland. In 1560, he purchased the greater part of the remaining portion of the manors of Tuxford, and his son, Sir John White, completed the acquisition of the whole. Thomas White died on 26 October 1580, and is buried with his wife (who survived him) in the smaller of the two vaults of the White’s mortuary chapel on the north side of the Church of St. Nicholas, Tuxford.
