= John White (1699–1769) =

English politician

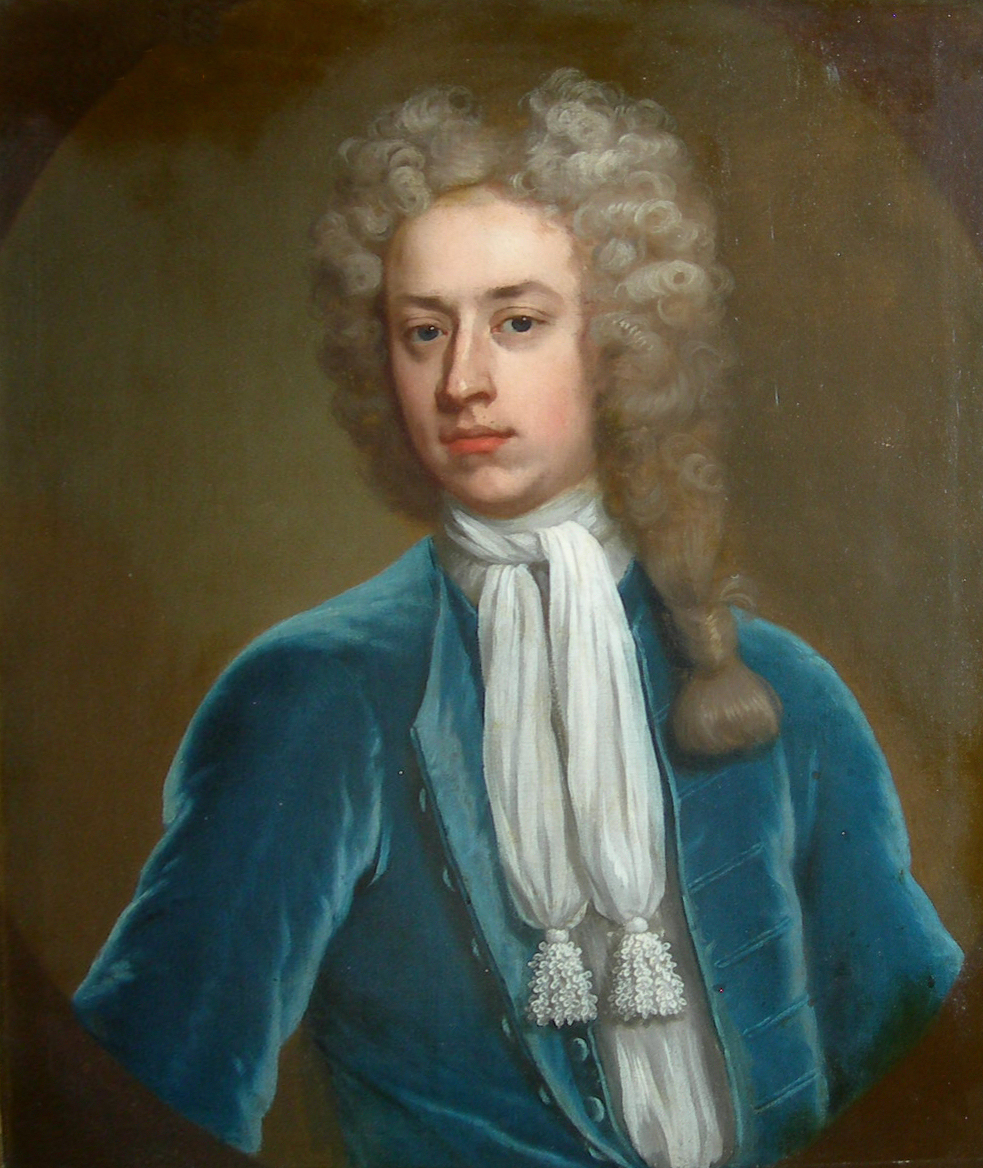
John White of Tuxford and Wallingwells.

John White (2 December 1699 – 7 September 1769), of Wallingwells, Nottinghamshire, was an English politician who sat in the House of Commons from 1733 to 1768.

== Early life ==
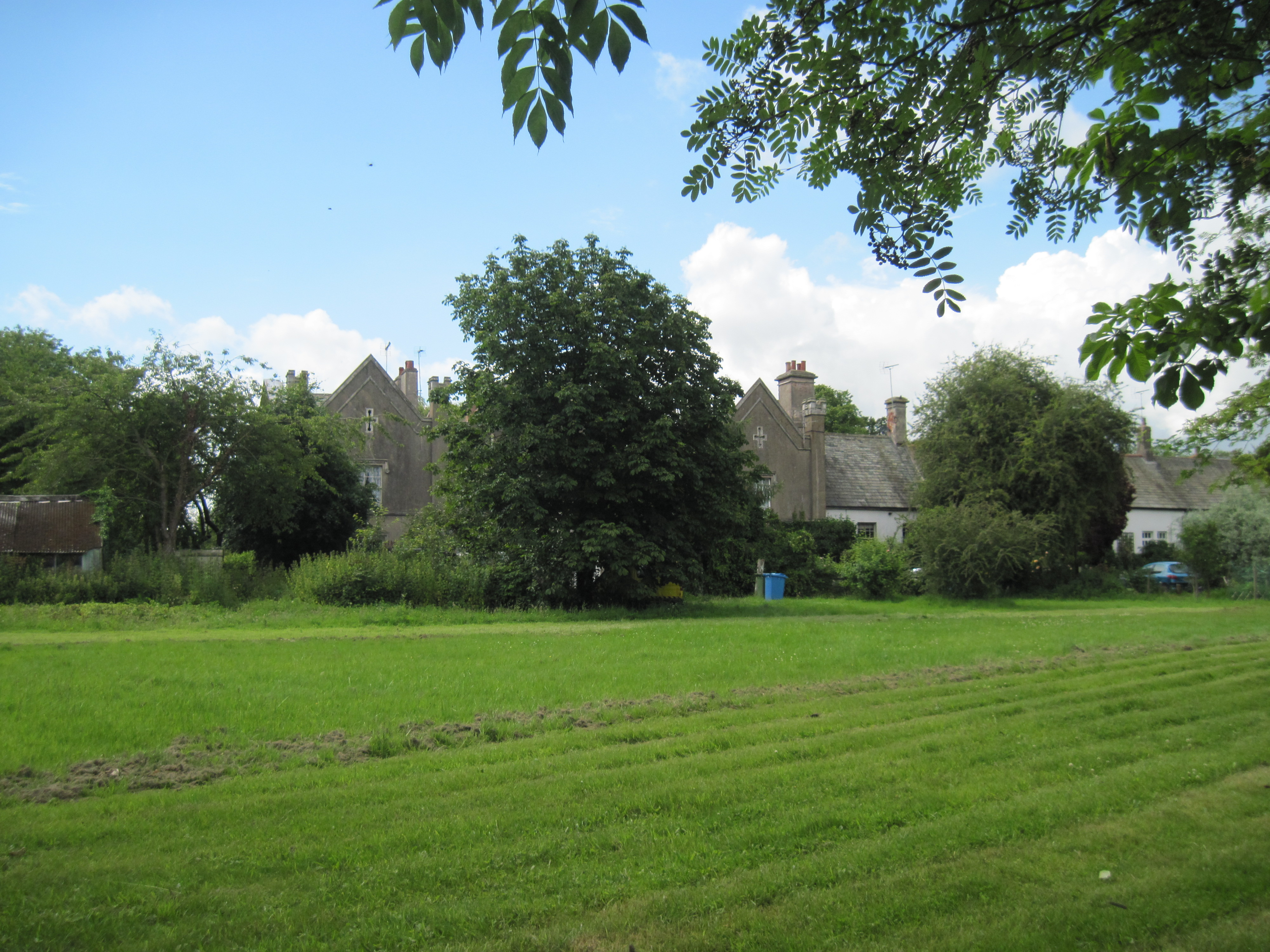
Wallingwells, Nottinghamshire

White was the eldest son and heir of Thomas White of Tuxford and Wallingwells and his wife Bridget Taylor daughter of Richard Taylor, MP, of Wallingwells. He succeeded to his father's estates, including Wallingwells in Nottinghamshire, at the age of 33 in 1732. A portrait of him as a young man show him as handsome, similar in looks to Prince Charles Edward Stuart.

== Career ==
White was an influential politician of his day. He was returned as Whig Member of Parliament for East Retford at a by-election on 26 January 1733 in succession to his father. He was returned unopposed at the 1734 British general election. He was elected a trustee and a common councillor of the Georgia Society. In 1736, he resigned from the council together with Robert More, though remaining a trustee. He was a professed Dissenter and no friend to church establishment' and disapproved of the Society's policy of appropriating land in Georgia to the endowment of the Church of England. Also in 1736, he spoke and voted against a proposal that Parliament should contribute £4,000 towards the repair of Henry VII's chapel. In 1739 he introduced a motion for the repeal of the Test Act. He voted with the Government on the Spanish convention that year but was absent from the division on the place bill in 1740. He was re-elected at the 1741 British general election, after a costly contest. Due to ill-health, he was absent on the division on the chairman of the elections committee but voted with the Government in all other recorded divisions. He was a supporter of Henry Pelham and the Duke of Newcastle, who were the Prime Ministers between 1744 and 1756. In particular he held sway over the Duke of Newcastle, who was a close friend of both John and his late father, Thomas. Their relationship is seen in a book of letters from the Duke to White.

White was returned unopposed at the 1754 British general election and returned again at the 1761 British general election. He made only two speeches in the period, on the peace preliminaries, on 10 December 1762, and on a point of order in a debate on the Regency, on 9 May 1765. He lost control at East Retford, and at the 1768 British general election he decided not to stand.

Each season White would travel in great state to London in a coach and six, attended by a throng of servants and outriders. The park at Wallingwells was well stocked with deer and its ponds teeming with fish. When at Wallingwells, John hunted and showed generous hospitality to his guests. He built the grotto on the edge of one of the ponds just south of the house.

== Death and legacy ==
White died unmarried on 7 September 1769. He was succeeded by his younger brother Taylor White.

Parliament of Great Britain
Preceded by Thomas White; Sir Robert Clifton	Member of Parliament for East Retford; 1733–1768; With: Sir Robert Clifton 1733–1741; William Mellish 1741–1751; John Shelley 1751–1768	Succeeded by Sir Cecil Wray; John Offley
