= Milton, Nottinghamshire =

Coordinates: 53.250924°N 0.934632°W

Milton
- Location within Nottinghamshire
- District: Bassetlaw
- Shire county: Nottinghamshire
- Region: East Midlands
- Country: England
- Sovereign state: United Kingdom
- Post town: NEWARK
- Postcode district: NG22
- Police: Nottinghamshire
- Fire: Nottinghamshire
- Ambulance: East Midlands
- UK Parliament: Newark

Milton is a hamlet in Nottinghamshire. It is part of West Markham civil parish, a short distance northwest of West Markham and southwest of Sibthorpe.

== Mausoleum ==
The mausoleum at Milton was designed by Robert Smirke and built in 1831–2. It was intended as a tomb for the Duchess of Newcastle who died in 1822. In 1896, Cornelius Brown wrote of the mausoleum:

Here is the vault of the noble family of Clinton; and herein the two last Dukes of Newcastle were interred. The church contains a monument to the fourth Duke, and opposite to it is a beautiful piece of statuary to the memory of his Duchess, by Westmacott. The inscription states that her Grace "gave birth to fourteen children, ten of whom lived to deplore the bereavement of an incomparable mother. Of the others, Anne Maria preceded her by a few months, and it is humbly hoped led the way to regions of eternal bliss. Two infants were carried by their parent to the grave."

It became the parish church of West Markham in 1833, replacing the old church until the 20th century, when the old church was restored and became the parish church again, and the church at Milton was no longer used. Since 1972 it has been cared for by the Churches Conservation Trust.

"This church is cared for by The Churches Conservation Trust. Although no longer needed for regular worship, it remains a consecrated building, a part of England's history, maintained for the benefit of this and future generations."

(from the plaque by the door of the building)
