= West Markham =

Village and civil parish in Nottinghamshire, England

Coordinates: 53.246432°N 0.920961°W

- Village and civil parish
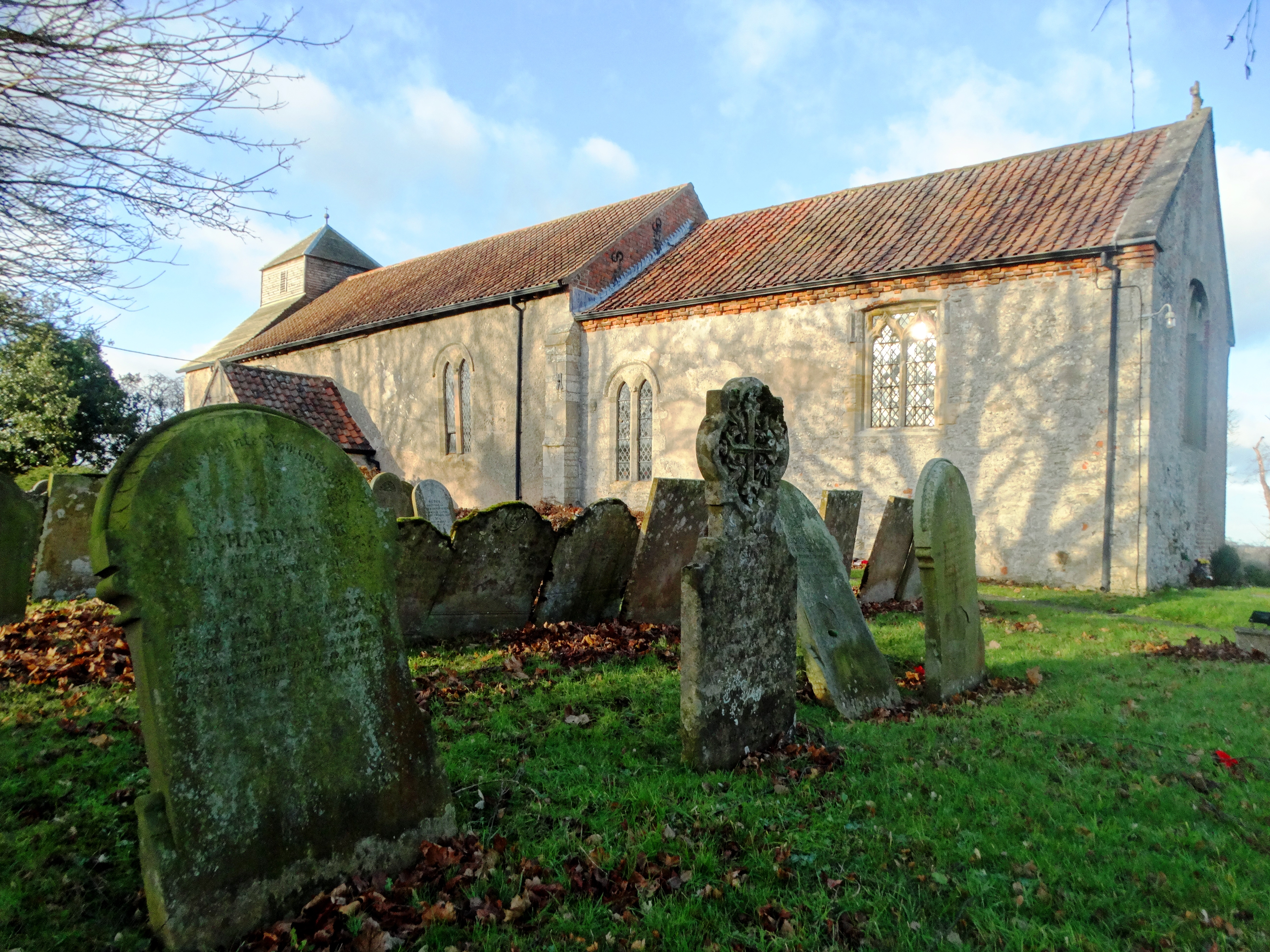
- All Saints' Church

- Location within Nottinghamshire
- Interactive map of West Markham
- Area: 1.73 sq mi (4.5 km^{2})
- Population: 175 (2021)
  - Density: 101/sq mi (39/km^{2})
- OS grid reference: SK721727
  - London: 125 mi (201 km) SSE
- Civil parish: West Markham
- District: Bassetlaw
- Shire county: Nottinghamshire
- Region: East Midlands
- Country: England
- Sovereign state: United Kingdom
- Post town: Newark
- Postcode district: NG22
- Dialling code: 01777
- Police: Nottinghamshire
- Fire: Nottinghamshire
- Ambulance: East Midlands
- UK Parliament: Newark
- Website: markhamclintonpc.org.uk

West Markham or Markham Clinton is a village and civil parish 23 miles (37 km) north east of Nottingham, in the Bassetlaw district, in the county of Nottinghamshire, England. In the 2011 census, the parish had a population of 170, and this increased marginally to 175 residents at the 2021 census. The parish touches Bevercotes, West Drayton, East Markham, Bothamsall, Walesby and Tuxford. The A1 previously went through the village but its now been bypassed.

== Features ==
There are 4 listed buildings in West Markham. West Markham has a church called All Saints' Church.

== History ==
The name "Markham" means 'Boundary homestead/village'. The name "Clinton" comes from the family name of the earls of Lincoln. Markham Clinton was recorded in the Domesday Book as Westmarcham. The medieval village of West Markham is now unoccupied but still has earthworks. On 1 April 1935 a part of Tuxford parish was transferred to the parish. The transferred area was 46 acres. The village has also been called Parva Markham and Little Markham.
