= All Saints' Church, Weston, Nottinghamshire =

All Saints' Church, Weston
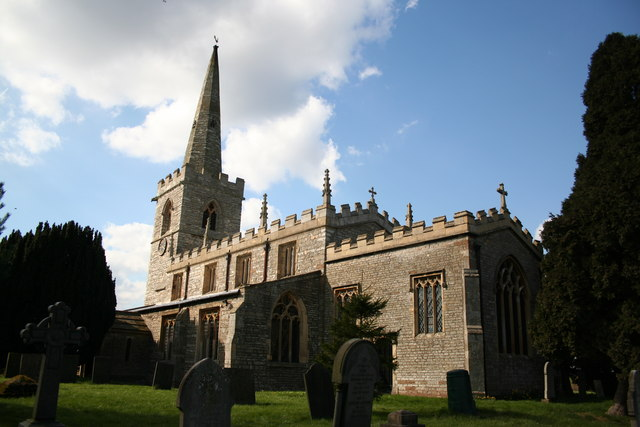
- All Saints' Church, Weston
- All Saints' Church, Weston
- 53°12′12.41″N 0°50′33.69″W
- OS grid reference: SK 77416 68015
- Location: Weston, Nottinghamshire
- Country: England
- Denomination: Church of England

History
- Dedication: All Saints'

Architecture
- Heritage designation: Grade I listed

Administration
- Province: York
- Diocese: Diocese of Southwell and Nottingham
- Archdeaconry: Newark
- Deanery: Newark and Southwell
- Parish: Weston

Clergy
- Archbishop: Archbishop of York
- Bishop(s): Bishop of Southwell & Nottingham & Bishop of Sherwood
- Dean: Rev Milner (Area Dean)

All Saints' Church, Weston is a Grade I listed parish church in the Church of England in Weston, Nottinghamshire.

== History ==
The church was built in the 13th century. It was restored in 1768 and the 19th century.

Bells The church has three change-ringing bells and a sanctus bell. The three bells are unringable due to their dilapidated state. The treble is dated 1646 and was cast by George I Oldfield, the second dated 1500 and was cast by Richard Mellours, and the tenor weighs 10 cwt and is dated 1888; it was cast by John Taylor & Co. It is not known who cast the sanctus bell, however it is dated 1699.

=== Tuxford Benefice ===
The Tuxford Benefice is made of five churches.

- St Nicholas, Tuxford
- All Saints, Weston
- All Saints, West Markham
- St Matthew, Normanton on Trent
- St Wilfrid, Low Marnham

== See also ==
- Grade I listed buildings in Nottinghamshire
- Listed buildings in Weston, Nottinghamshire
