= Sir John White =

Sir John White's (1558–1625) was a government official in the Kingdom of England. Sir John was twenty-two when he succeeded his father, Thomas White, as High sheriff of Nottinghamshire.

== Marriage ==
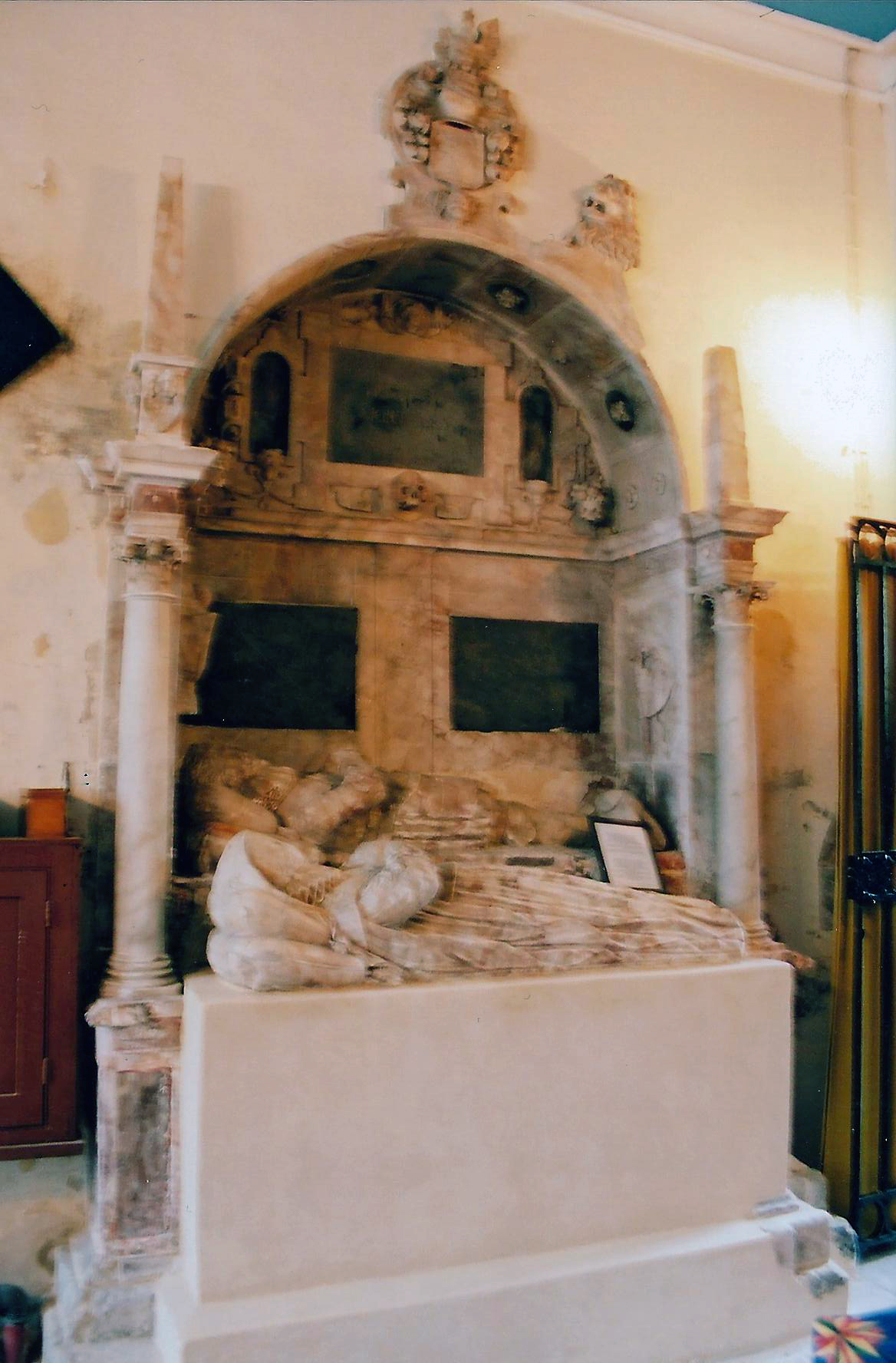
The Tomb of Sir John and Lady White in the White Chapel of the Church of St. Nicholas, Tuxford

Sir John White was married at the age of 32 to Dorothea Harpur, daughter of John Harpur of Swarkston. Sir John's father-in-law was "one of the most considerable gentlemen in Derbyshire." The Harpur pedigree can be traced for 14 generations before Dorothy, Lady White, beginning with Richard Harper, temp. Henry I. Dorothea White's grandmother, on her father's side, was Jane Finderne, heiress of Finderne. Of the house of Finderne, Burke writes- "The hamlet of Finderne, in the Parish of Mickleover, about four miles from Derby, was the chief residence of a family who derived their name from the place of their patrimony for nine generations,. From the times of Edward I to those of Henry VIII, when the male line became extinct and the estate passed, by the marriage of the heiress to the Harpurs, the house of Finderne was one of the most distinguished in Derbyshire. Members of it had won their spurs in the Crusades and also at the Cressy, and the Agincourt. Their territorial possessions were large as the Findernes were High Sheriffs, and were occasionally rangers of Needwood Forest, and also custodians of Tutbury Castle. Finderne originally erected temp. Edward I and restored and enlarged at one of the quaintest and largest mansions in the Midlands at different periods. The present Church had rows of monumental brasses and altar tombs, all memorials of the Findernes. Local legend says that the Findernes brought the so-called Finderne Flower back from the Holy Land by Sir Geoffrey Finderne.

== Knighthood ==
At Greenwich, on 9 June 1619, King James I knighted Sir John White.

== Family ==
In 1615, Sir John's second son, Richard White, died at age nineteen and was buried at Tuxford. His third son, Gervase, also died young. His eldest, Thomas, succeeded his father. Sir John had one daughter, Anne, who married (at a date not known) John Welby of Moulton, in Lincolnshire, one of the same family of Welby into which the previous generation had married. She died sometime prior to 1634 and left only one daughter, Mary, who died young.

In 1623, Sir John was High sheriff of Nottinghamshire. Two years later, in 1625, he died on Christmas Day at age sixty-seven. In his times the execution of the Queen of Scots, the dispersal of the Armada, the Gunpowder Plot, the discoveries of Galileo, the assassination of Henry IV of France, and the Puritan colonisation of New England took place.

Lady White erected, in the family burial place in Tuxford church, ^{"} a fair tomb" of alabaster, in memory of her husband, leaving a space in the inscription for the date of her own death which has never been inserted. This is likely because of her grandson, who was in inheritance when it took place, was more remiss than her children. The inscription is as follows:

"HIC JACET JOHANNES WHITE, MILES, FILIUS ET HAERES THOMAE WHITE, ARMIG. SERVI QUONDAM PHILIPPI ET MARIAE, REGIS ET REGINAE ANGLIAE ET AGNETIS CECILL, SORORIS WILLIELMI CECILL BARONIS DE BURGHLEIGH SUMMI ANGL. THESAURII QUI QUIDEM JOHANNIS OBIIT IN FESTIUM NATIVITATIS DOMINO ANNO 1625.

DOROTHEA UXOR CHARISSIMA PRAEDICTI JOHANNIS WHITE FILIA IOHANNIS HARPUR DE SWARKESTONE IN COM. DERB. MILITIS IN PIAM POSTERITATIS MEMORIAM ET SPEM CERTAM FUTURAE RESURRECTION MONUMENTUM HOC POSUIT. OBIIT DIE ANNO."

Which roughly translates to:

"Here lies John White, soldier, son and heir of Thomas White, Esquire, servant of Philip and Mary, king and queen of England and Agnes Cecill sister of William Cecill Baron of Burghley, Lord Treasurer of England, John died on Christmas Day of 1625. Dorothea, the dearly beloved wife of the said John White, son of John Harpur on Swarkeston in Com. Derby. in loving memory and in certain hope of the resurrection, was this monument created. Died this year."

In a niche in the monument lay recumbent full-length figures of Sir John and Lady White – he with ruff and armour, she with ruff, gold chain, and an embroidered dress, all elaborately worked in alabaster, on which the remains of gilding are to be seen, especially on the links of the chain and the cushions on which the heads of the two figures recline. The fragments of a cherub kneeling at their feet remain. Within the canoed recess, above the figures are two tablets of black marble with the inscription, flanked by pillars and surmounted by a sword and helmet, death's heads, &c. Above the niche is alabaster ornamentation which is supported on two pillars and surmounted by the family arms, an eagle sable from a ducal coronet, or; shield, gules, a chevron varie between three lioncells rampant or. In Withies' Visitation of Nottinghamshire, 1612, the coronet is argent; so it is in Betham's "Baronetage, and the Patent of Baronetcy;" but Thoroton, and all other authorities, make it or.

The appearance of a coronet in a gentleman's crest of he who is not of the order of nobility denotes, say that old heraldic treatises, deeds of arms done by his house, is never granted, but is for prowess in the field and denotes notable achievement.

In the years 1633, 1634 and 1637, Lady White made a deed of gift of various lands in Arnall, Nottinghamshire, to her cousin-german George Pierrepoint, "out of great affection" (she writes) "to him and his father." He was the fourth son of her uncle Robert Pierrepoint, Earl of Kingston, who says a historian, "was not more distinguished for his ample fortune than for the endowment of his mind." The earl was an ardent loyalist. In the civil wars, he was lieutenant-general of the King's forces in Lincoln, Rutland, Huntingdon, Cambridge, and Norfolk. He lost his life at Gainsborough. His wife was one of the granddaughters of George, Earl of Shrewsbury. The Pierrepoints trace from Robert de Perpont, who came to England with the Normans, held lands in Sussex under the famous Earl Warren.

The Harpur family continued in great opulence during the reign of King James. Richard, of Calke, brother of the head of the house, was knighted by the King, and annalists have left descriptions of the many dinners and entertainments held at the Harpur seats. During the civil wars, they were staunch Royalists and suffered heavily as a consequence by being fined by the Parliament more than once. Lady White, survived to the year 1653 when Cromwell was at the zenith of his power.
