= Weston, Nottinghamshire =

Village and civil parish in Nottinghamshire, England

Coordinates: 53.20°N 0.84°W

Weston
- Village and civil parish
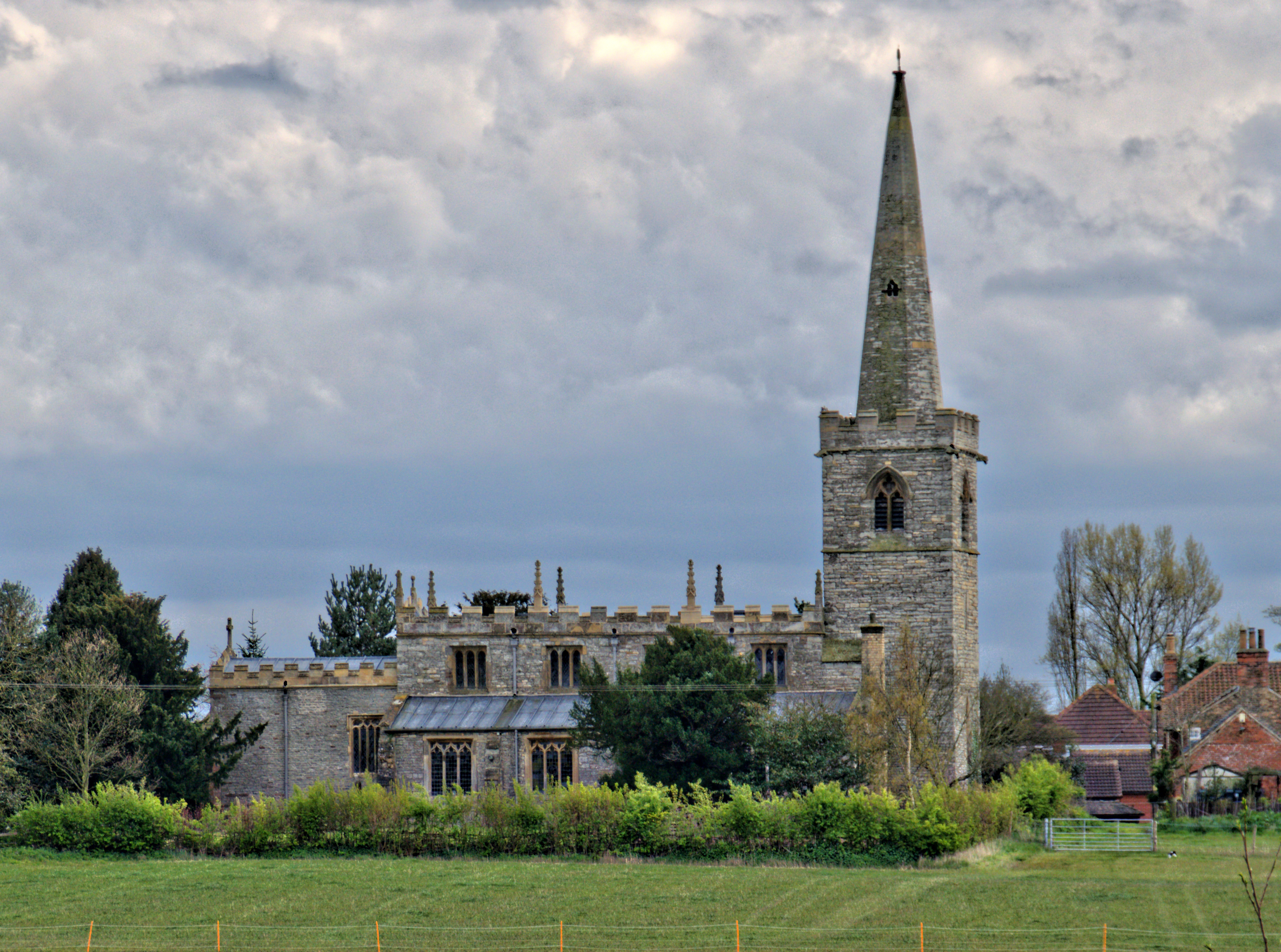
- All Saints' church

- Location within Nottinghamshire
- Interactive map of Weston
- Area: 2.71 sq mi (7.0 km^{2})
- Population: 333 (2021)
  - Density: 123/sq mi (47/km^{2})
- OS grid reference: SK 775679
  - London: 120 mi (190 km) SSE
- District: Newark and Sherwood
- Shire county: Nottinghamshire
- Region: East Midlands
- Country: England
- Sovereign state: United Kingdom
- Post town: NEWARK
- Postcode district: NG23
- Dialling code: 01636
- Police: Nottinghamshire
- Fire: Nottinghamshire
- Ambulance: East Midlands
- UK Parliament: Newark
- Website: www.westonparishnotts.org.uk

Weston is a village and civil parish in Nottinghamshire, England.

== Geography ==
It is located 10 miles south of Retford. According to the 2001 census it had a population of 312, increasing to 393 (and including Grassthorpe) at the 2011 census, Weston alone reported 333 residents at the 2021 census.

The parish church of All Saints is 13th century. At the south-east end of the village are three 16th-century tenements built with cruck trusses.

=== Oil fields ===
There were numerous oil fields in the 1950s, to the west of the main road.

== History ==
In 1870–72, John Marius Wilson's Imperial Gazetteer of England and Wales described Weston like this: "WESTON, a parish, with a village, in Southwell district, Notts; on the Great Northern railway, 3 miles NNW of Carlton-on-Trent. Post town, Newark. Acres, 1,690. Real property, £2,745. Pop., 380. Houses, 85. The manor belongs to Earl Manvers. The living is a rectory in the diocese of Lincoln. Value, £500. Patron, Earl Manvers. The church was recently repaired, and has a tower and spire. There are a Wesleyan chapel and an endowed school."

=== 1956 mid-air collision ===
There was a mid-air collision on Sunday 26 February 1956, next to the main road. It involved three Provost aircraft from RAF Syerston.

Provost WV485 hit the wing of Provost WV559. Firemen attended from Newark and Tuxford. Maxwell N Saverge was killed. Workers at the nearby oil fields arrived to help.

The other Provost landed at RAF Skellingthorpe

== See also ==
- Listed buildings in Weston, Nottinghamshire
