= Robert Smirke (architect) =

English architect (1780–1867)

Sir Robert Smirke
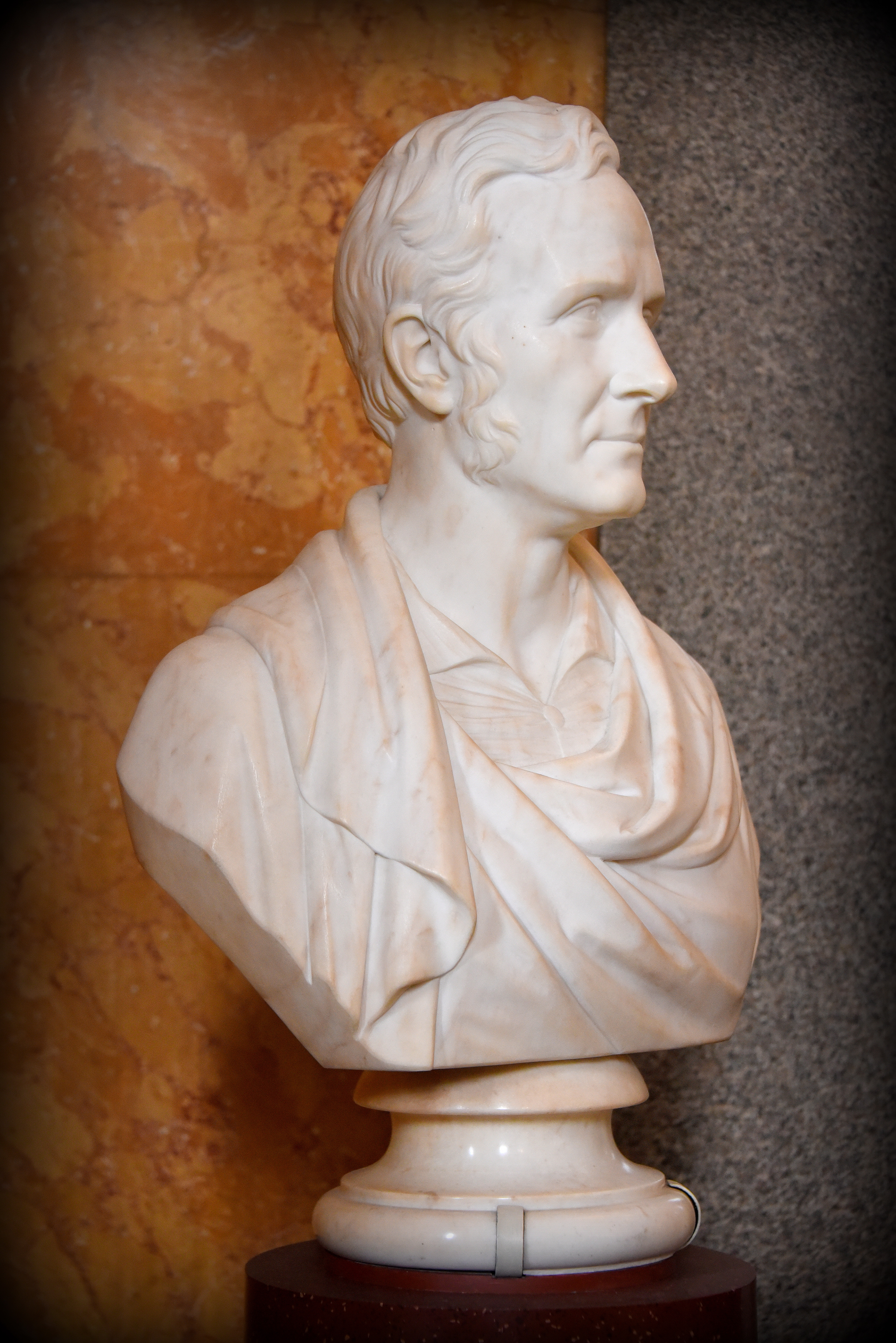
- Born: 1 October 1780; London, England
- Died: 18 April 1867 (aged 86); Cheltenham, Gloucestershire, England
- Occupation: Architect
- Awards: Royal Gold Medal (1853)
- Buildings: The British Museum

Sir Robert Smirke RA (1 October 1780 – 18 April 1867) was an English architect, one of the leaders of Greek Revival architecture, though he also used other architectural styles (such as Gothic and Tudor). As an attached (i.e. official) architect within the Office of Works, he designed several major public buildings, including the main block and façade of the British Museum and altered or repaired others. He was a pioneer in the use of structural iron and concrete foundations, and was highly respected for his accuracy and professionalism. His advice was often sought in architectural competitions and urban planning, especially later in his life.

== Background and training ==
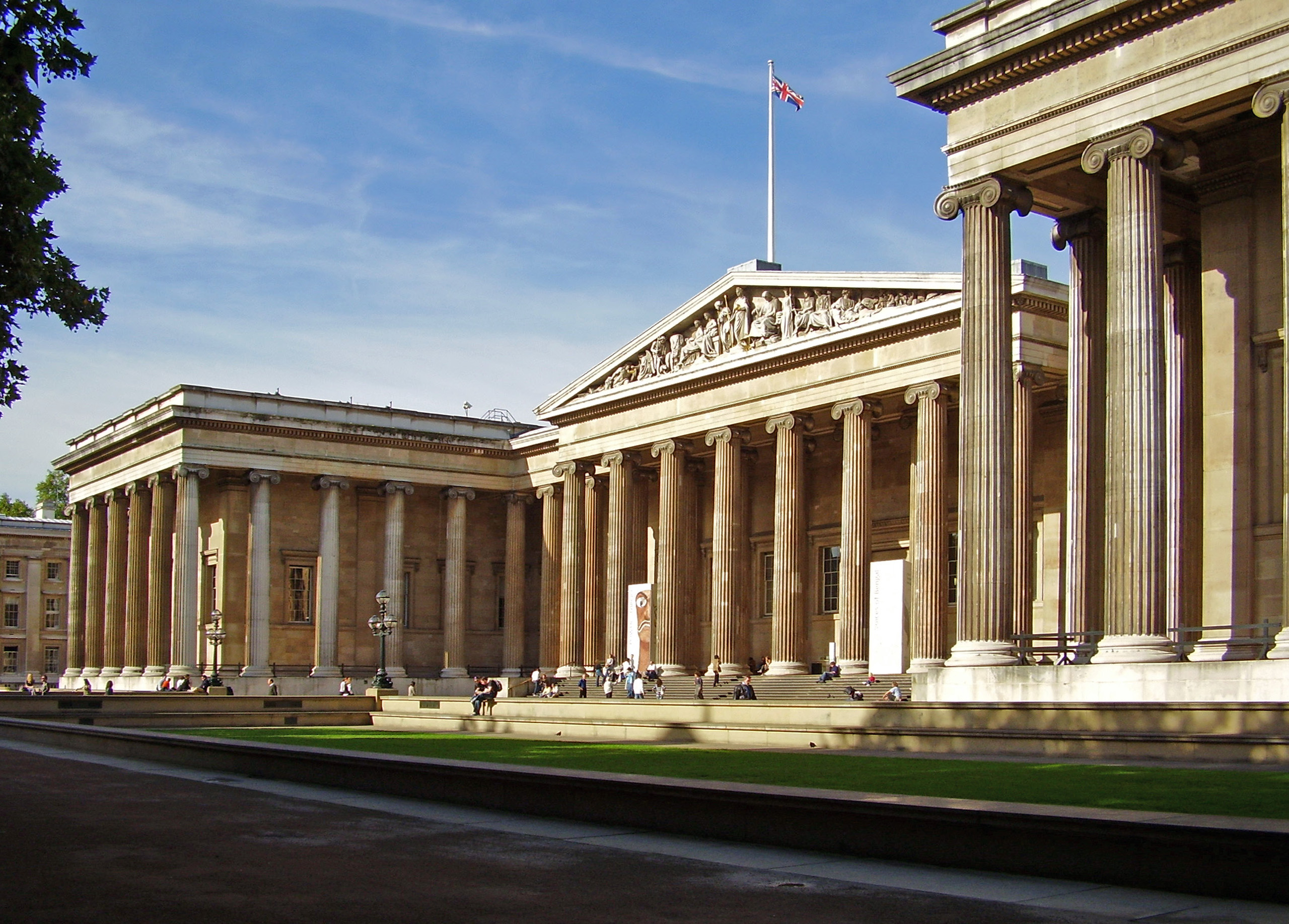
The main block and façade of the British Museum was designed by Robert Smirke.

Smirke was born in London on 1 October 1780, the second son of the portrait painter Robert Smirke; he was one of twelve children. He attended Aspley School, Aspley Guise, Bedfordshire, where he studied Latin, Greek, French and drawing, and was made head boy at the age of 15. In May 1796, on the recommendation of George Dance the Younger, Smirke he began his study of architecture as a pupil of John Soane but left after only a few months in early 1797 due to a personality clash with his teacher. He wrote to his father:

He (Soane) was on Monday morning in one of his amiable Tempers. Everything was slovenly that I was doing. My drawing was slovenly because it was too great a scale, my scale, also, being too long, and he finished saying the whole of it was excessively slovenly, and that I should draw it out again on the back not to waste another sheet about it.

In 1796, he also began his studies at the Royal Academy, winning the Silver Medal and the Silver Palette of the Royal Society for the Encouragement of Arts, Manufactures & Commerce that year. He was awarded the Gold Medal of the Royal Academy in 1799 for his design for a National Museum. After leaving Soane he depended on George Dance the Younger and a surveyor called Thomas Bush for his architectural training.

In 1801, accompanied by his elder brother Richard, he attempted to embark on a Grand Tour, but was forced to return to England because war with France made it impossible to travel safely without fear of arrest. The short-lived Peace of Amiens the following year allowed British travellers to visit France, and Smirke set off again in September 1802 in the company of the artist William Walker, returning early in 1805. His itinerary and impressions are recorded in a series of letters and journals he wrote, many preserved in the archive of the RIBA, and in the many drawings he made of buildings and locations. In France he visited places such as Paris, Lyon, Avignon, Nîmes, Arles and Marseille; he was particularly impressed by the various Roman monuments in the south of the country. While in Italy, he passed through Genoa, Pisa, Florence and Siena but spent almost two months in Rome where he made the decision to visit Greece. Embarking from Messina, he travelled via the Ionian Islands to Corinth and the Argolid. Turning south into the Peloponnese, he saw the famous sites of Messene, Megalopolis, Bassai and Olympia, before travelling on to Athens where he spent a month sketching the monuments. From Athens Smirke wrote to his father:

How can I by description give you any idea of the great pleasure I enjoyed in the sight of these ancient buildings of Athens! How strongly were exemplified in them the grandeur and effect of simplicity in architecture! The Temple of Theseus (Temple of Hephaestus)... cannot but arrest the attention of everyone from its appropriate and dignified solemnity of appearance. The temple of Minerva (Parthenon)... strikes one in the same way with its grandeur and majesty. We were a month there. The impression made upon my mind... had not in that time in the least weakened by being frequently repeated and I could with pleasure spend a much longer time there, while those in Rome (with few exceptions) not only soon grow in some degree uninteresting but have now entirely sunk into disregard and contempt in my mind. All that I could do in Athens was to make some views of them...hoping that they will serve as a memorandum to me of what I think should always be a model.'

Following his departure from Athens, Smirke visited other famous ancient sites such as Thebes and Delphi.

Smirke's return from Greece was complicated by the resumption of war between Britain and France, and he had to travel via Sicily and Malta to avoid the risk of capture by enemy troops, though this challenge allowed him to visit and draw some of the famous Greek archaeological sites of Sicily. He also managed to revisit Naples (seeing the ruins of Pompeii and Paestum) and Rome, as well as other cities, as he travelled up the Italian peninsula towards Venice, Padua, Vicenza and Verona. Crossing into Austrian territory, he visited Innsbruck, Salzburg, Vienna, and Prague before moving on to Dresden and Berlin, returning to England via Heligoland in early January 1805.

His extensive travels through most of the major centres of Europe provided him with an unparalleled insight on ancient, Renaissance and more recent architecture. His poor opinion of many of the more recent buildings he saw, even in Rome and Paris, combined with the overwhelming impact of ancient Greek structures, triggered a significant shift in his architectural tastes. Whereas his earlier designs had been in the conventional French Neo-Classical idiom of the time, influenced by his mentor George Dance the Younger and by John Soane, most of the classical-style buildings he designed as a professional architect were firmly rooted in the Greek Revival. Unlike some of his contemporaries he did not visit (modern) Turkey. His knowledge of its ancient buildings, which were crucial to Ionic order widely used in the 1820s, especially the British Museum, was derived from publications such as Ionian Antiquities of 1769 by Richard Chandler, William Pars and Nicholas Revett.

During his Grand Tour, Smirke made drawings and watercolours of many buildings, including most of the surviving ancient structures in Athens and the Morea. Most however were never published, and few were exhibited in his lifetime, though a considerable number are preserved in the RIBA, the Paul Mellon Center for British Art, the British Museum, and other collections.

== Career ==
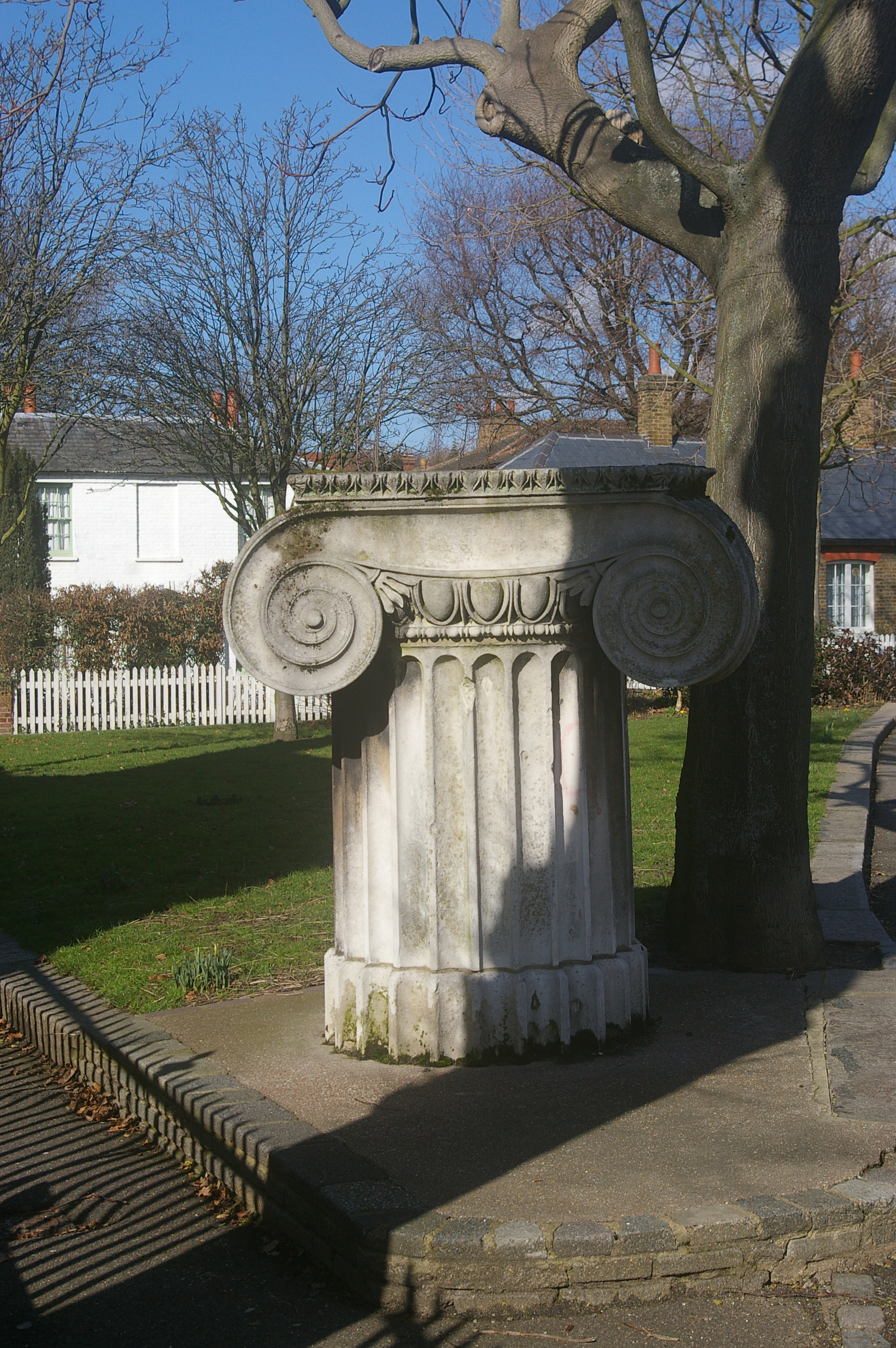
Surviving Ionic capital in Walthamstow by Smirke, all that remains of his former General Post Office Building in London

In 1805, Smirke became a member of the Society of Antiquaries of London and the Architects' Club. His first official appointment came in 1807 when he was made architect to the Royal Mint. He was elected an Associate of the Royal Academy on 7 November 1808, and a full Academician on 11 February 1811, his diploma work consisting of a drawing of a reconstruction of the Acropolis of Athens. He only ever exhibited five works at the Academy, the last in 1810.

Smirke's relations with Soane reached a new low after the latter, who had been appointed Professor of Architecture at the Royal Academy, heavily criticised Smirke's design for the Covent Garden Opera House in his fourth lecture on 29 January 1810. He said:

The practise of sacrificing everything to one front of a building is to be seen, not only in small houses where economy might in some degree apologize for the absurdity, but it is also apparent in large works of great expense ... And these drawings of a more recent work (here two drawings of Covent Garden theatre were displayed) point out the glaring impropriety of this defect in a manner if possible still more forcible and more subversive of true taste. The public attention, from the largeness of the building, being particularly called to the contemplation of this national edifice

Together with John Nash and Sir John Soane, he was appointed as attached (i.e. official) architect to the Office of Works in 1815 (an appointment he held until 1832) at a salary of £500 per annum, thereby reaching the height of the profession. In 1819 he was made surveyor of the Inner Temple. In 1819, he married Laura Freston, daughter of The Reverend Anthony Freston, the great-nephew of the architect Matthew Brettingham. The only child of the marriage was a daughter Laura. In 1820, he was made surveyor of the Duchy of Lancaster, and also in 1820 he became treasurer to the Royal Academy. He was knighted in 1832, and received the RIBA Royal Gold Medal for Architecture in 1853. Smirke lived at 81 Charlotte Street, London, commemorated now by a blue plaque on the building. He retired from practice in 1845, after which Robert Peel made him a member of the Commission for London Improvements. In 1859, he resigned from the Royal Academy and retired to Cheltenham, where he lived in Montpellier House, Suffolk Square. He died there on 18 April 1867 and was buried in the churchyard of St Peter's Church, Leckhampton. His estate was worth £90,000.

He is known to have designed or remodelled over twenty churches, more than fifty public buildings and more than sixty private houses. This productivity inspired James Planché's 1846 chorus in his burlesque of Aristophanes' The Birds:

Go to work, rival Smirke
Make a dash, À la Nash
Something try at, worthy Wyatt
Plans out carry, great as Barry

The rapid rise of Smirke was due to a combination of his great ability with significant political patronage. He was a Tory at a time when this party was in the ascendant. His friends at the Royal Academy, such as Sir Thomas Lawrence, George Dance, Benjamin West and Joseph Farington, were able to introduce him to patrons such as: the 1st Marquess of Abercorn; the 1st Viscount Melville; Sir George Beaumont, 7th Baronet; the 4th Earl of Aberdeen; the 3rd Marquess of Hertford; the 3rd Earl Bathurst; John 'Mad Jack' Fuller; and the 2nd Earl of Lonsdale. These politicians and aristocrats ensured his rapid advancement and several were to commission buildings from Smirke themselves. Thomas Leverton Donaldson described Smirke as able to please "Men whom it was proverbially impossible to please". His patron at Lowther Castle, the 1st Earl of Lonsdale, said he was "ingenious, modest and gentlemanly in his manners".

== Style ==
=== Classicism ===
Smirke's first major work, the rebuilt Covent Garden Theatre, was the first Greek Doric building in London. John Summerson described the design as demonstrating "how a plain mass of building could be endowed with a sense of gravity by comparatively simple means". During the early part of his career Smirke was, along with William Wilkins, the leading figure in the Greek Revival in England. At the General Post Office in London in the mid-1820s he was still using the giant order of columns with a certain restraint, but by the time he came to design the main front of the British Museum, probably not planned until the 1830s, all such moderation was gone and he used it lavishly, wrapping an imposing colonnade around whole façade.

=== Gothic Revival ===
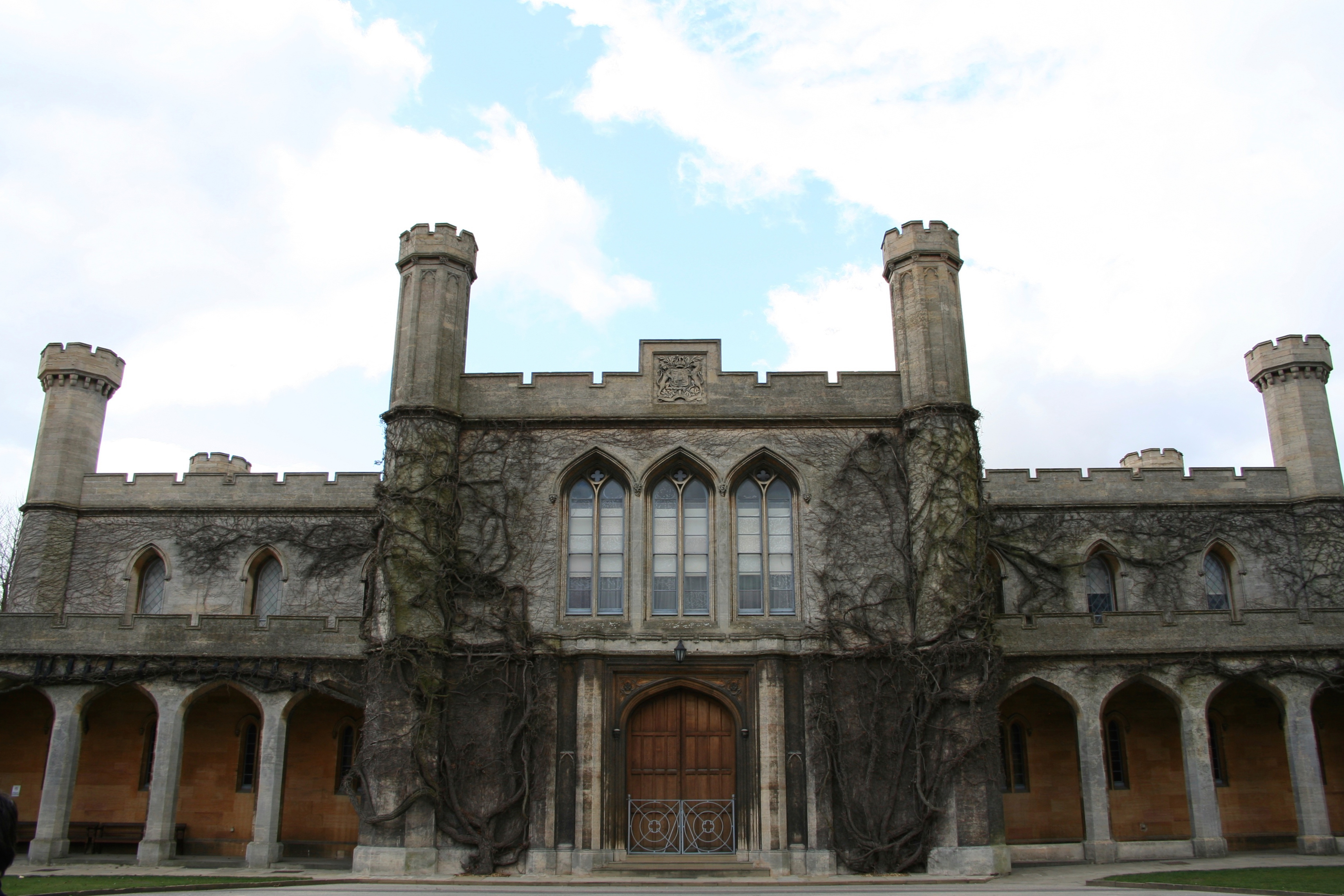
The Gothic revival Assize Court, Lincoln Castle, Lincoln, 1822–6

Smirke, in the view of Charles Locke Eastlake, came third in importance amongst the Gothic Revival architects of his generation, after John Nash and James Wyatt, but criticised his work for its theatrical impracticability. He said that his Eastnor Castle (1808–15), a massive, gloomy building with watch towers and a keep, "might have made a tolerable fort before the invention of gunpowder, but as a residence it was a picturesque mistake".

== Constructional innovation ==
Smirke was a pioneer of using both concrete and cast iron. A critic writing in 1828 in the Athenaeum said "Mr. Smirke, is pre-eminent in construction: in this respect he has not his superior in the United Kingdom". James Fergusson, writing in 1849, said "He was a first class builder architect ... no building of his ever showed a flaw or failing and ... he was often called upon to remedy the defects of his brother artist."

Projects in which he used concrete foundations included the Millbank Penitentiary, the rebuilding of the London Custom House and the British Museum. At the first two he was called in when work overseen by previous architects had proved unstable. The Millbank Prison (1812–21; demolished c. 1890) had been designed by an architect called William Williams, but his plan was then revised by Thomas Hardwick. The largest prison in Europe, it consisted of a hexagonal central courtyard with an elongated pentagonal courtyard on each outer wall of the central courtyard; the three outer corners of the pentagonal courtyards each had a tower one storey higher than the three floors of the rest of the building. Work had started under Hardwick in late 1812, but when the boundary wall had reached a height of about six feet it began to tilt and crack. After 18 months, with £26,000 spent, Hardwick resigned. Work continued and by February 1816 the first prisoners were admitted, but the building creaked and several windows spontaneously shattered. Smirke and the engineer John Rennie the Elder were called in, and they recommended demolition of three of the towers and the underpinning of the entire building with concrete foundations: the first known use of this material for foundations in Britain since the Roman Empire. The work cost £70,000, bringing the total cost of the building to £458,000.

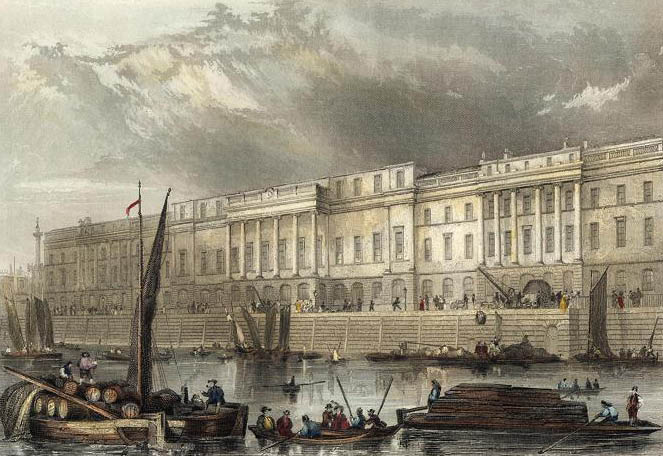
, The Thames front of the London Custom House

From 1825 to 1827 Smirke rebuilt the centre of the Custom House in the City of London, following the failure of its foundations. The building had been erected from 1813 to the designs of David Laing. The building is 488 feet long, the central 200 feet being Smirke's work.

Smirke was also a pioneer in the structure use of cast iron beams in non-industrial contexts, working in collaboration with leading engineers of the day. This is initially seen in domestic buildings such as Eastnor Castle and Worthy House, and then in larger projects, such as the 40-foot wide beams supporting the floors of the upper galleries at the British Museum;.

Another area where Smirke was an innovator was in the use of quantity surveyors to rationalise the various eighteenth-century systems of estimating and measuring building work.

== Writings ==
In 1806 he published the first and only volume of an intended series of books Specimens of Continental Architecture. Smirke started to write a treatise on architecture in about 1815 and although he worked on it for about 10 years never completed it. In it he made his admiration for the architecture of ancient Greece plain. He described it as "the noblest", "simple, grand, magnificent", "with its other merits it has a kind of primal simplicity". This he contrasted with the Architecture of ancient Rome which he described as "corrupt Roman taste", "An excess of ornament is in all cases a symptom of a vulgar or degenerate taste". Of Gothic architecture he described as '"till its despicable remains were almost everywhere superseded by that singular and mysterious compound of styles".

== Pupils and family ==
His pupils included Lewis Vulliamy, William Burn, Charles Robert Cockerell, Henry Jones Underwood, Henry Roberts, and his own brother Sydney who succeeded him as architect at the British Museum; although best known for the circular reading room at the British Museum, he added new galleries to his brother's original design in the same Greek Revival style. Another brother, Edward Smirke, was a lawyer and antiquarian. Their sister Mary Smirke was a noted painter and translator.

== London buildings ==
=== Royal Mint ===
The former Royal Mint, Tower Hill (1807–12). The main building was designed by the previous architect to the Mint James Johnson, but the design was modified by Smirke, who oversaw its execution. The long stone façade with a ground floor of channelled rustication, the two upper floors have a broad pediment containing the Royal Arms supported by six Roman Doric attached columns. The end bays are marked by four Doric pilasters; the Greek Doric frieze and lodges are probably by Smirke. The building contained an apartment for the Deputy Master of the Mint, the Assay Master, and Provost of the Moneyers as well as bullion stores and Mint Office.

=== Covent Garden Theatre ===
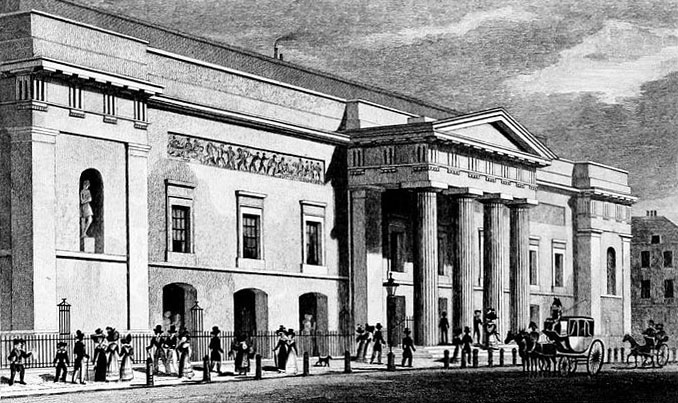
Covent Garden Theatre, burnt and rebuilt

The second incarnation of the Covent Garden Theatre (now the Royal Opera House), built in ten months in 1808–1809. It had a symmetrical façade with a tetrastyle portico in the centre, and was the first building in London to use the Greek Doric order. The portico was flanked by four bays, the end bays being marked by pilasters with a statue in a niche between. The three bays on each side of the portico had arches on the ground floor and windows above these and a single carved relief above designed by John Flaxman. The main entrance hall, behind the three doors in the portico, was divided into three aisles by square Doric piers. To the south was the grand staircase, rising between walls, the flight was divided into two sections by a landing, the upper floor had four Ionic columns each side of the staircase that supported a barrel vault over it. The horseshoe-shaped auditorium was on five levels, and seated 2,800 people, in addition to those in the many private boxes. The building was destroyed by fire in 1857.

=== Lansdowne House ===
Lansdowne House, (1816–19) interiors, notably the sculpture gallery, central part of room has a shallow barrel vault with plain coffering; antae mark off the part circular ends of the room.

=== London Ophthalmic Hospital ===
Smirke's London Ophthalmic Hospital in Moorfields (1821–2) moved in 1898 to a nearby site as Moorfields Eye Hospital.

=== General Post Office ===
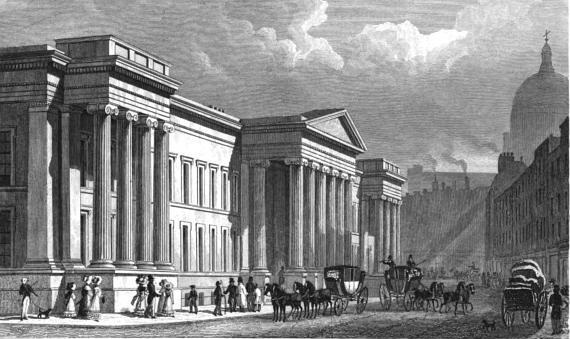
The General Post Office, demolished

The General Post Office building in St Martins-le-Grand in the City of London (1825–29; demolished c. 1912). This was the first purpose built post office in England. Its main facade had a central hexastyle Greek Ionic portico with pediment, and two tetrastyle porticoes, without pediments, at each end. The main interior space was the large letter-carriers' room, with an elegant iron gallery and a spiral staircase.

=== British Museum ===
The main block and facade of the British Museum, Bloomsbury (1823–46). This is Smirke's largest and best-known building. Having previously designed a temporary gallery for the Elgin Marbles following their acquisition by the British Museum in 1816, his role as architect to the Office of Works also led Smirke to be invited to redesign the museum in 1821. The core design dates from 1823, and stipulated a building surrounding a large central courtyard (or quadrangle) with a grand south front. Given the limited funds—which were granted by parliament on an annual basis—and the need to retain the Museum throughout the rebuilding programme, the work was divided into phases, and was subject to various changes before its completion over 25 years later. In particular, Smirke was forced to abandon plans for a much grander quadrangle with interior porticoes, while from the early 1840s modified the severity of the original design (such as sculpture designed by Richard Westmacott). The building is constructed of brick with the visible facades cased in massive slabs of Portland stone, which is also used for architectural elements and string courses along the sides of the building. The first part to be constructed was the "King's Library" of 1823–1828, which forms the east wing. The north section of the west wing, the "Egyptian Galleries" followed 1825–1834. The north wing, housing the library and reading rooms, was built in 1833–1838. The southern part of the west wing and south front were built in 1842–1846 following the demolition of the Townley Gallery and then of Montague House itself. Following Smirke's retirement in 1846, his brother Sydney Smirke continued to work on the building, adding galleries in the style of the original building, while also building the Round Reading Room in the centre of the quadrangle whose original purpose was superseded. Sydney Smirke also added polychromatic decoration in Greek Revival style to replace the plainer interiors designed by his brother, especially in the entrance hall and sculpture galleries.

The main feature of the south front is the great colonnade of 44 Greek Ionic columns. The columns are 45 feet high and five feet in diameter; their capitals are loosely based on those of the temple of Athena Polias at Priene and the bases on those of the temple of Dionysus at Teos. Many of the mouldings in turn derive from the Erechtheion in Athens, including the main doorway from the colonnade. At the centre of the colonnade is an octastyle portico, two columns deep; the colonnade continues for three more columns before embracing the two wings to either side. Beyond the facade Smirke built two smaller wings (the Residences), decorated across the front with Doric pilasters. The Residences originally contained houses for the principal officers of the Museum who were expected to live on site, such as the Principal Librarian (Director of the museum) and heads of departments (or Keepers). These buildings frame the main building and forecourt without dominating it, while also screening the backs of the buildings in the adjacent streets. The major surviving interiors are the entrance hall with the Great Stair – in the form of an Imperial staircase– rising to the west, and the "King's Library". This, built to house 65,000 books, is 300 feet long, 41 feet wide and 31 feet high, the centre section being slightly wider, with four great Aberdeen granite columns with Corinthian capitals carved from Derbyshire alabaster. The only major interior to survive in the north wing is the "Arched Room" at the west end. The "Egyptian Gallery" matches the "King's Library" but is much plainer in decoration.

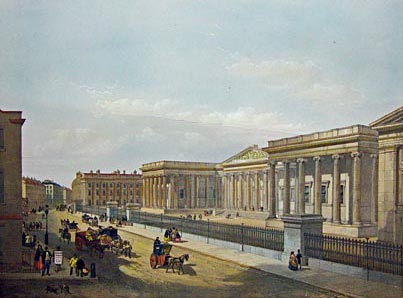
British Museum, 1852

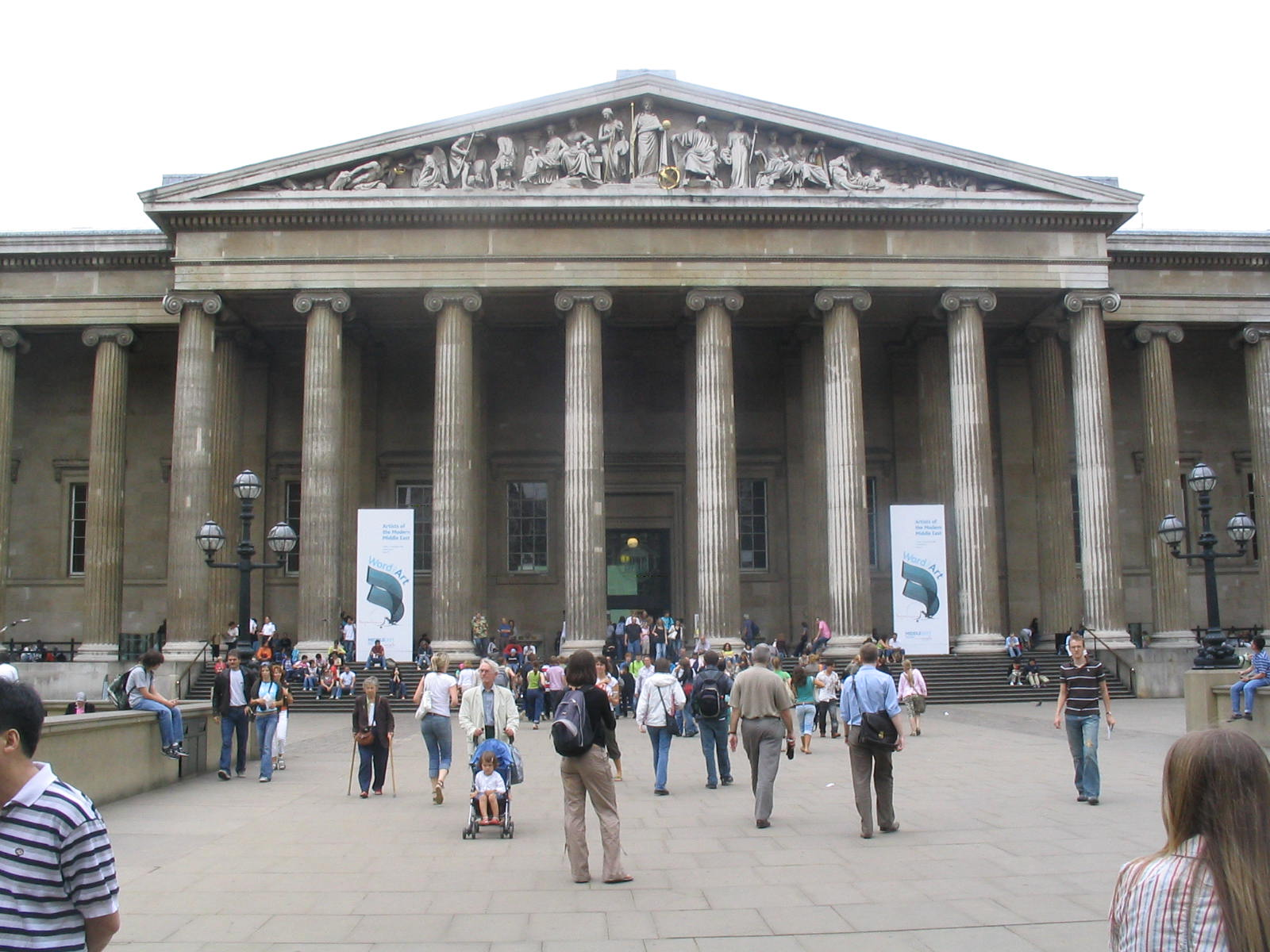
Entrance portico, British Museum

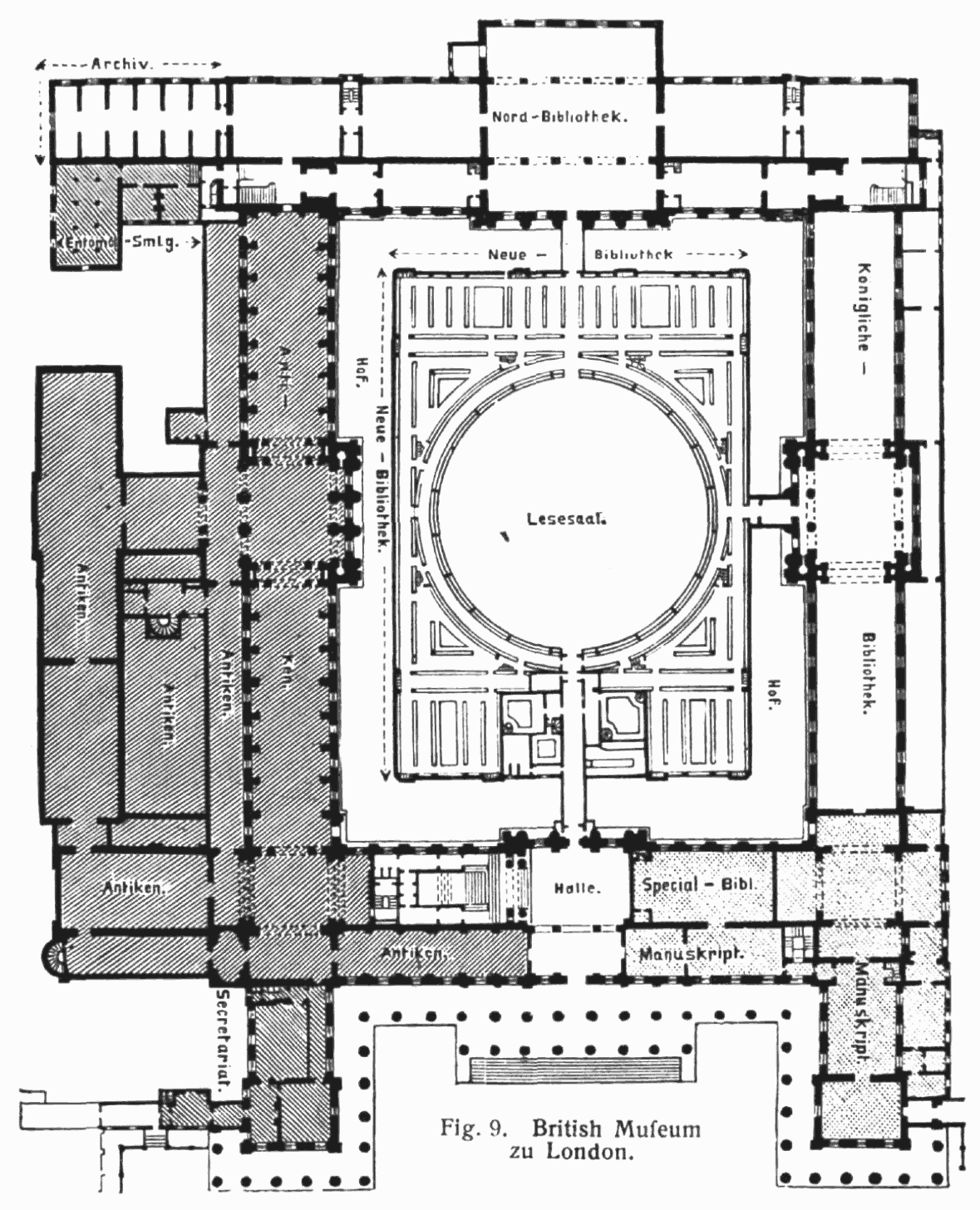
Plan of the British Museum

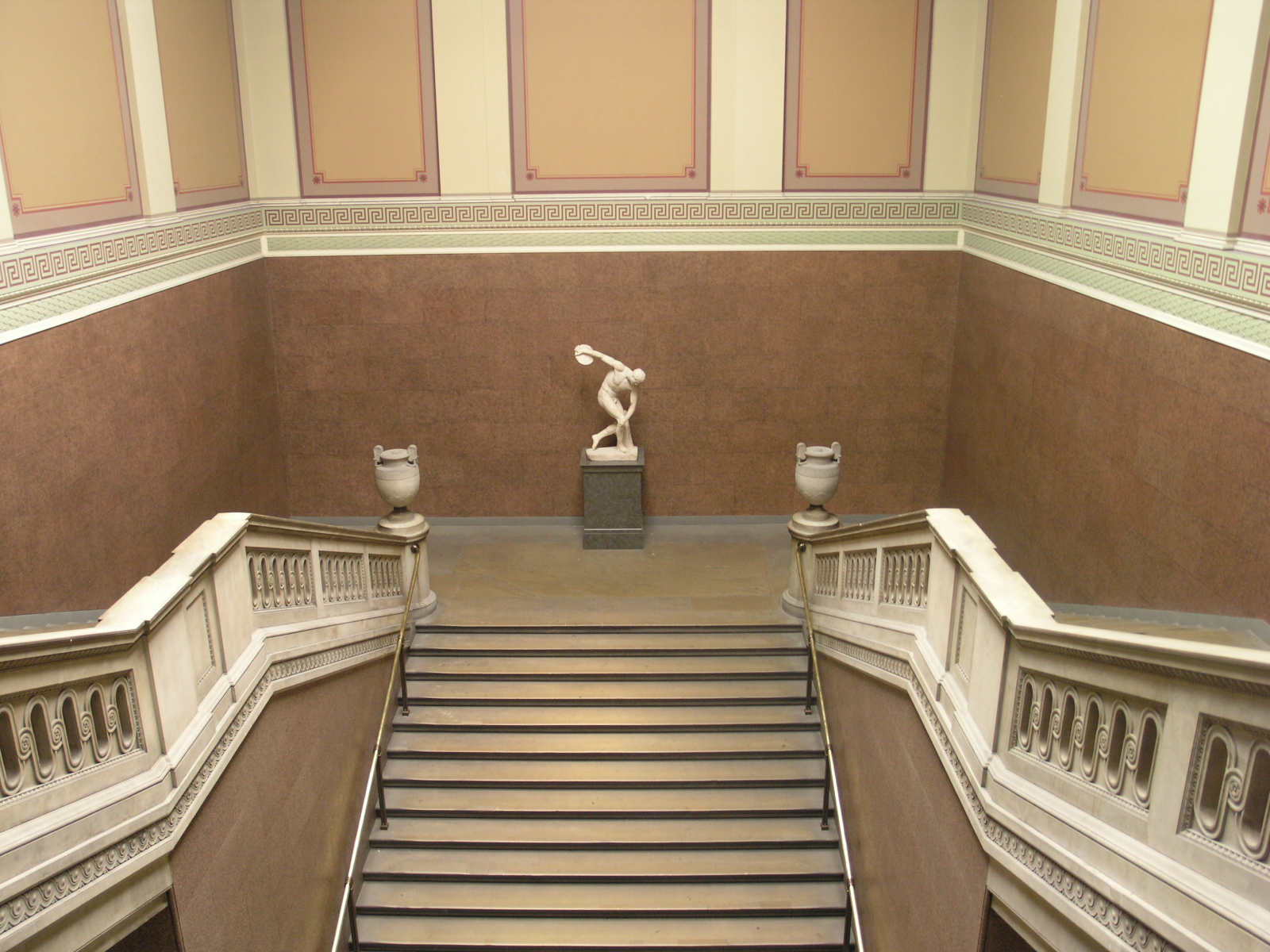
Main Staircase, Discobolus of Myron (the Discus-Thrower)

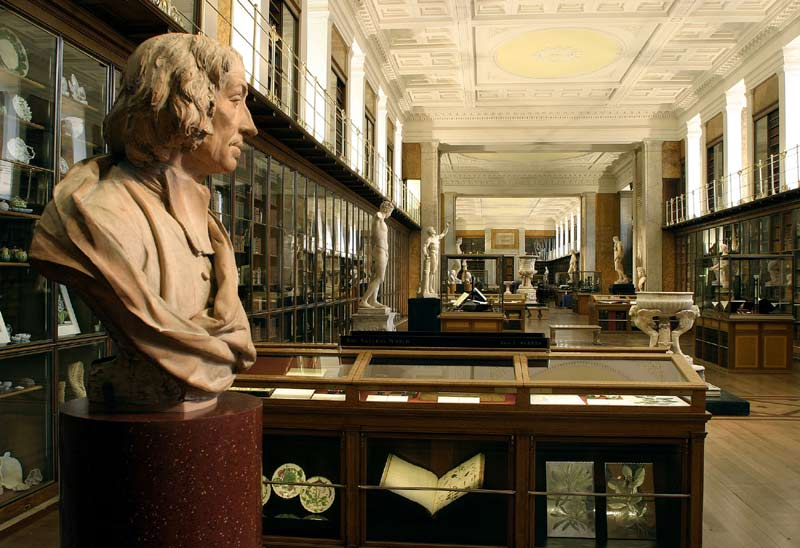
King's Library, British Museum

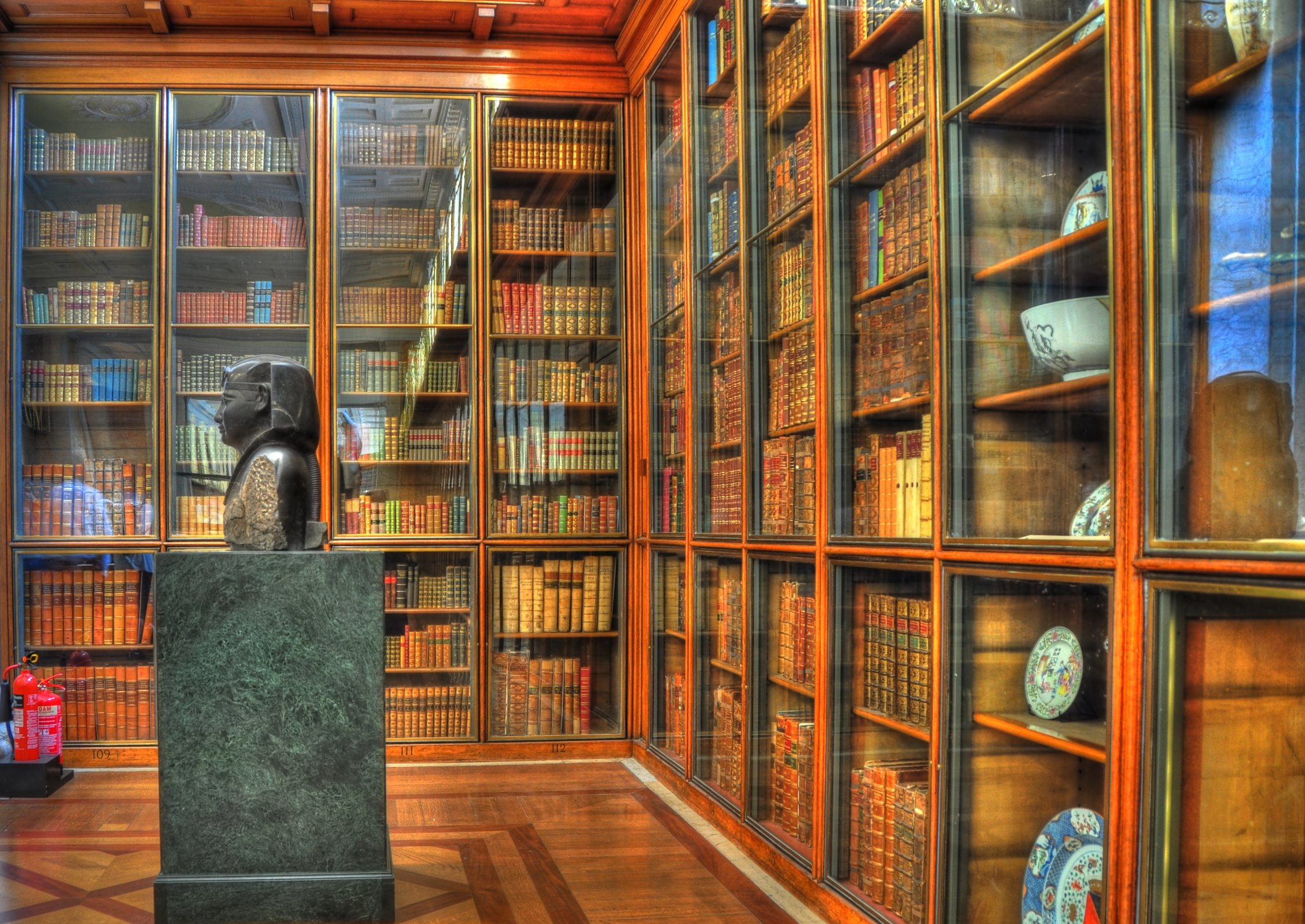
Bookcases in the King's Library, British Museum

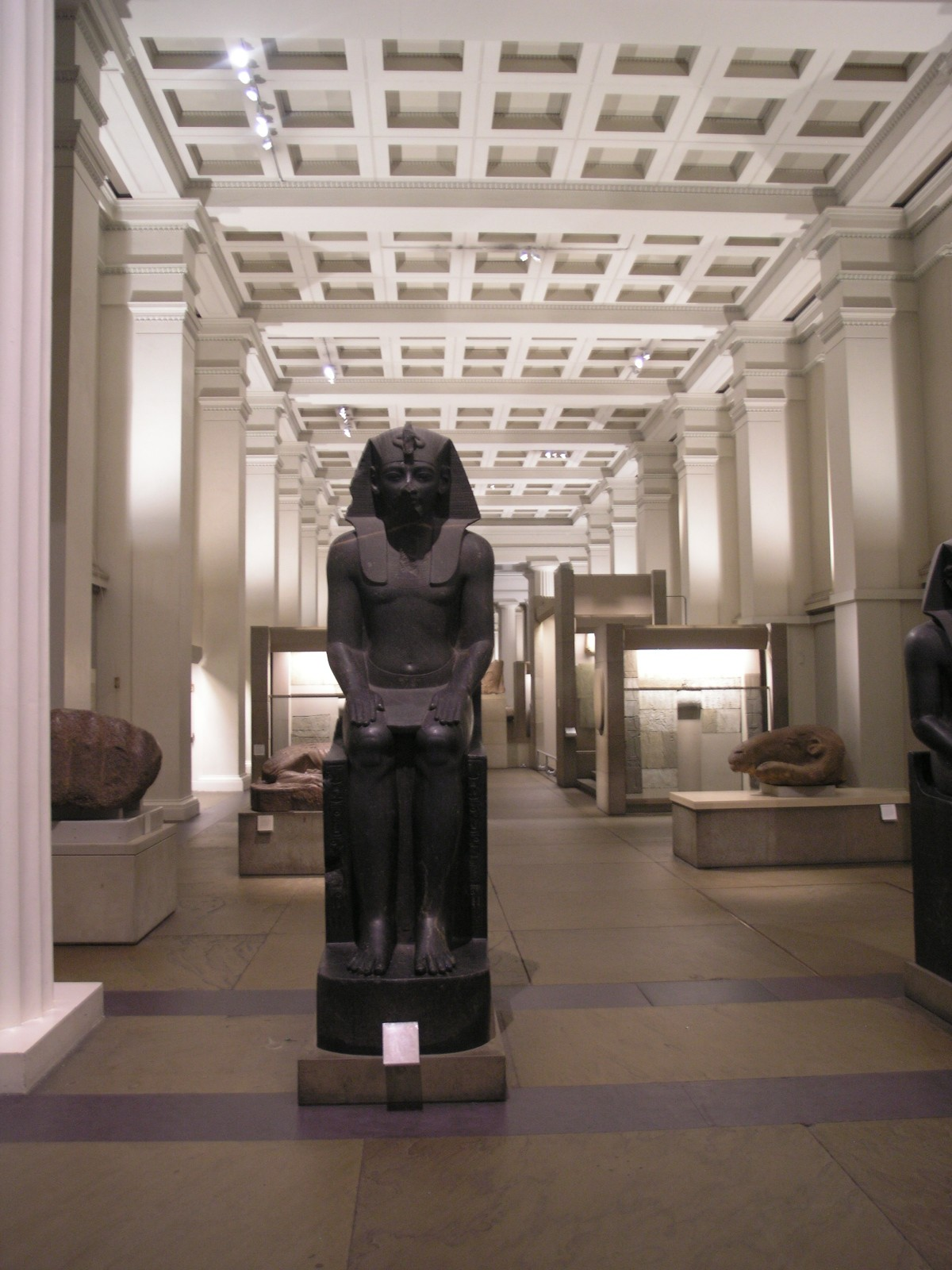
Egyptian Gallery, British Museum

=== The Inner Temple ===
Smirke's works at the Inner Temple included his only Gothic buildings in London. They included the library (1827–8) and the remodelling of the Great Hall in 1819 (which burnt down and was rebuilt by Sydney Smirke in 1868). Nearly all Smirke's work was destroyed in the 1940–1941 London Blitz and has been rebuilt to a completely different design, the only major survival being the Paper Buildings of 1838, in a simple classical style.

=== Former Royal College of Physicians ===
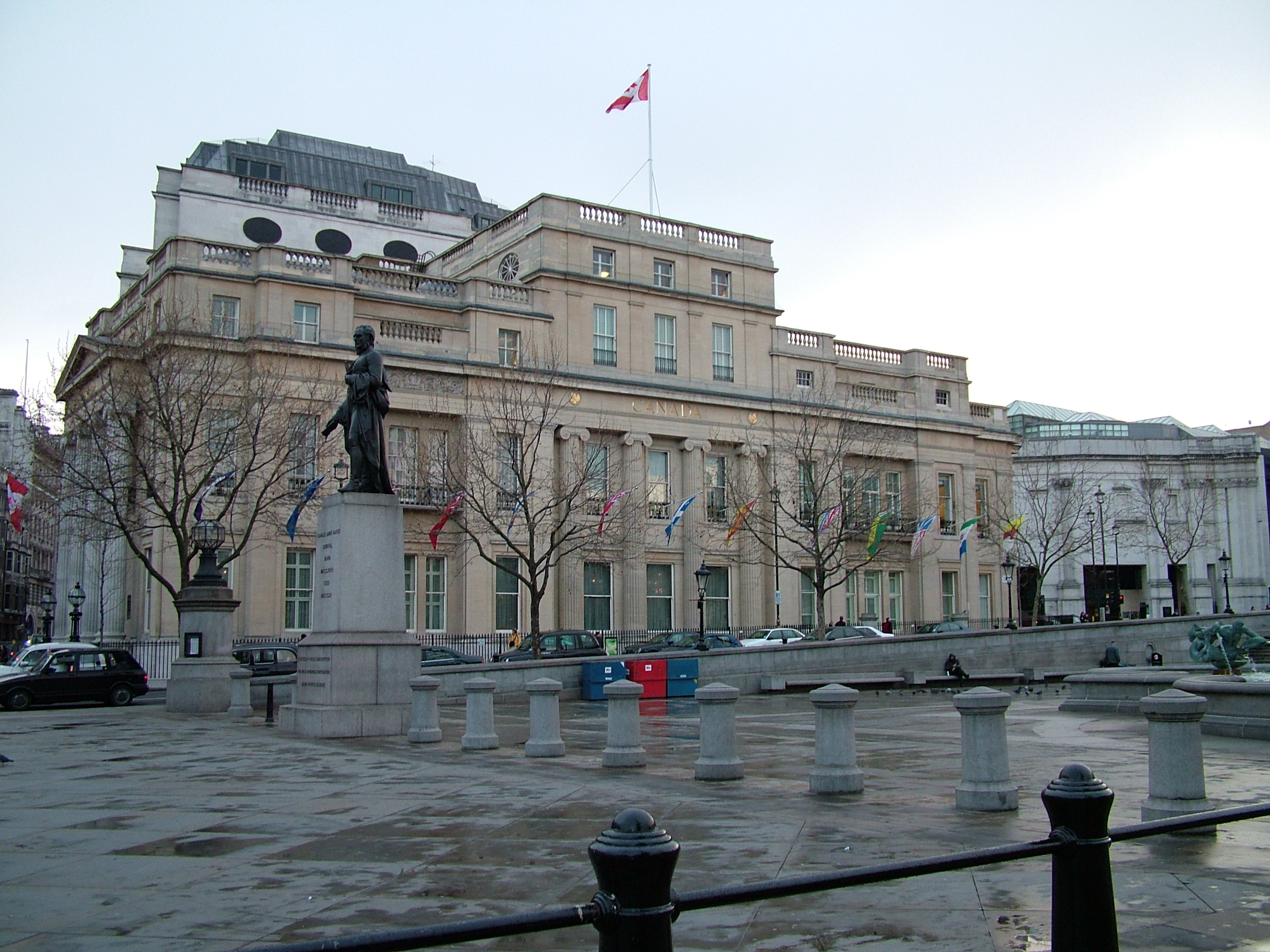
Canada House

The Royal College of Physicians and Union Club building (1824–27) in Trafalgar Square (now Canada House) The building is much altered, the north front though retains Smirke's hexastyle Ionic portico, and the east front (to Trafalgar Square) still has his portico in antis. The building is of Bath Stone. There were several extensions and remodellings during the 20th century.

=== Lancaster House ===
Smirke was first involved with the design of Lancaster House in 1825, was dismissed and then brought back in 1832. He added the top floor, and designed the interiors apart from the State Rooms. His involvement ceased in 1840.

=== Somerset House ===
The east wing of Somerset House, and the adjacent King's (formerly Smirke) Building of King's College London, on the Strand (1829–31). The Thames front follows the design of the original architect Sir William Chambers being a mirror image of the west wing, the building stretches back toward the Strand by 25 bays of two and half stories, the centre five bays with giant attached Corinthian columns and end three bays are of three full stories and also the end bays have Corinthian pilasters, and general being plainer than the facades by Chambers.

=== Carlton Club ===
Carlton Club (1833–6) was rebuilt 1854–1856 by Sydney Smirke, bombed in 1940 and later demolished.

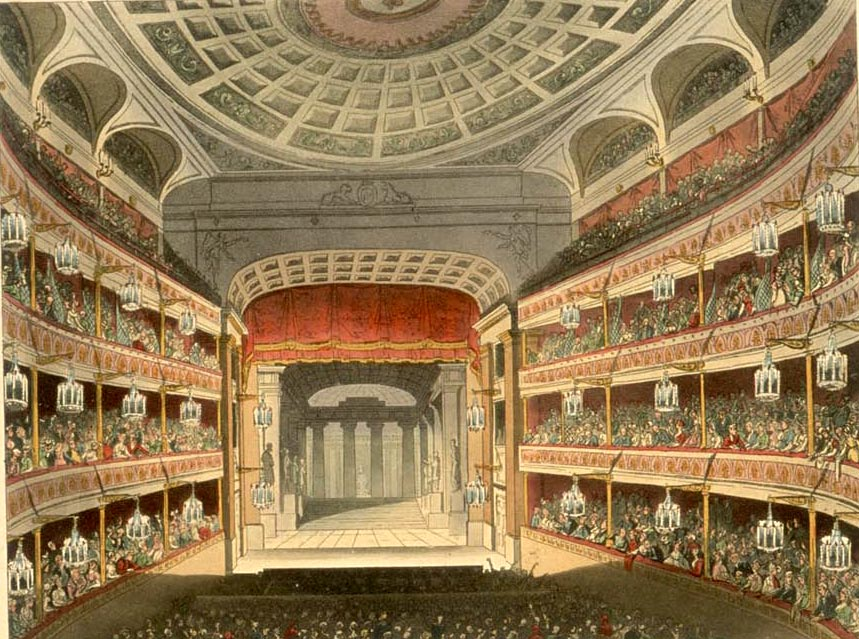
Covent Garden Theatre, burnt and rebuilt

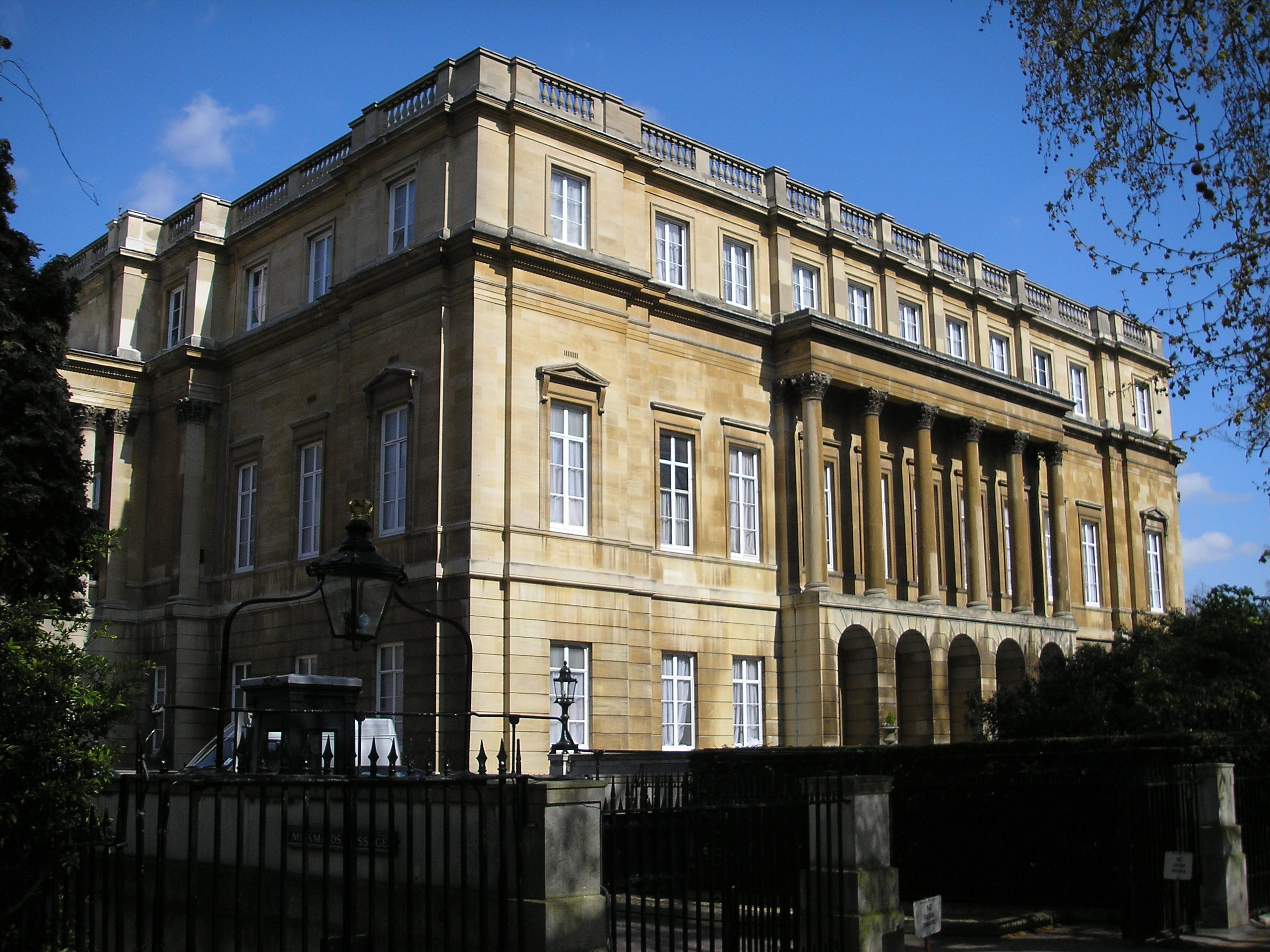
Lancaster House

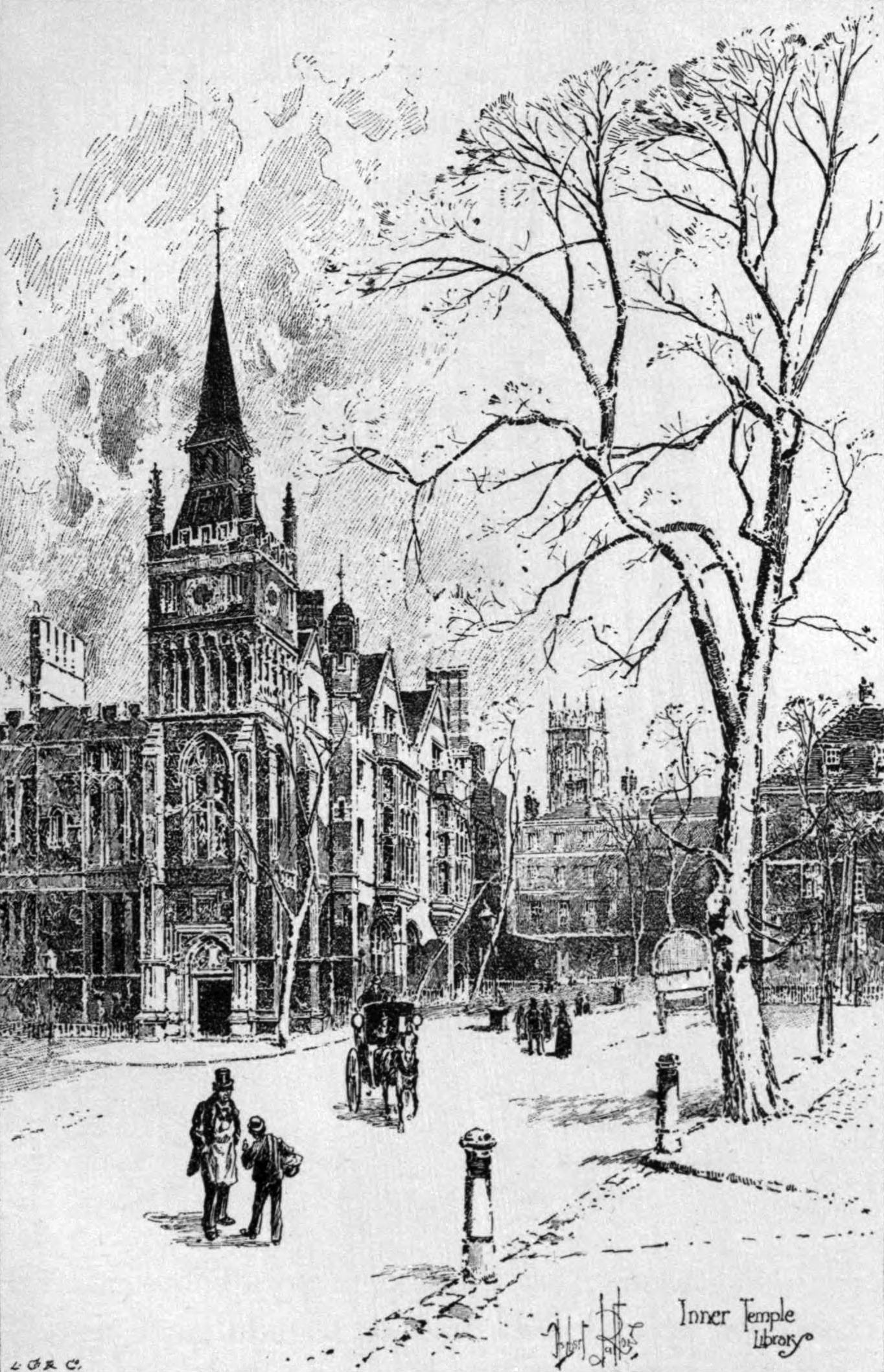
Inner Temple Library

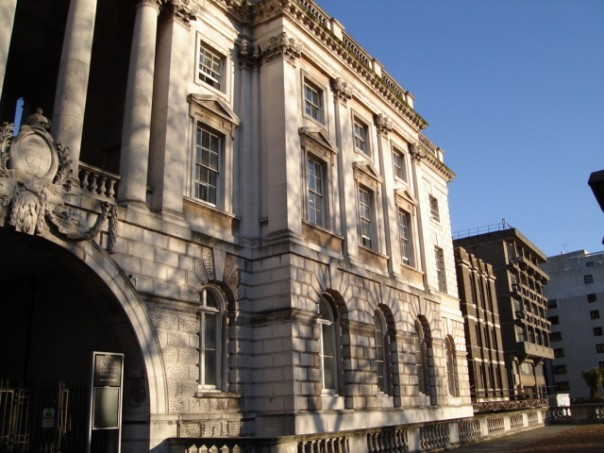
King's College London, east wing of Somerset House

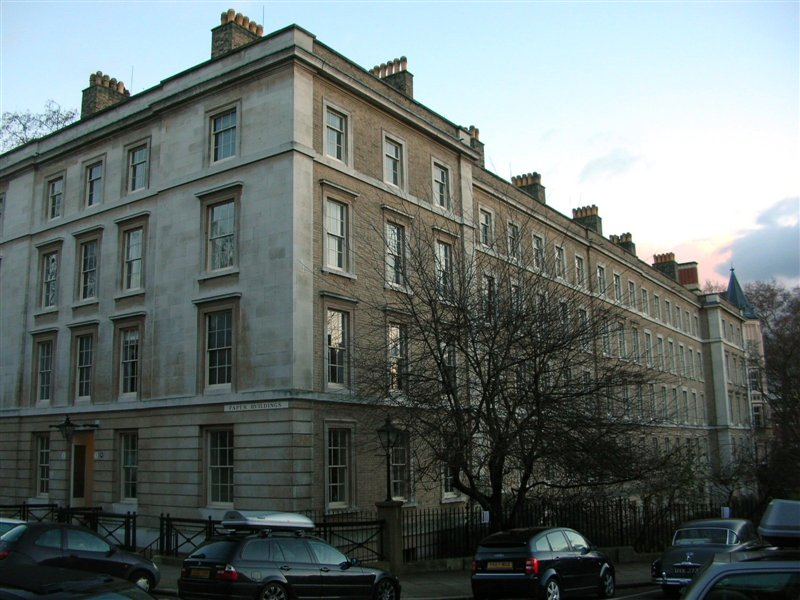
Paper Buildings, Inner Temple

=== The Oxford and Cambridge Club ===
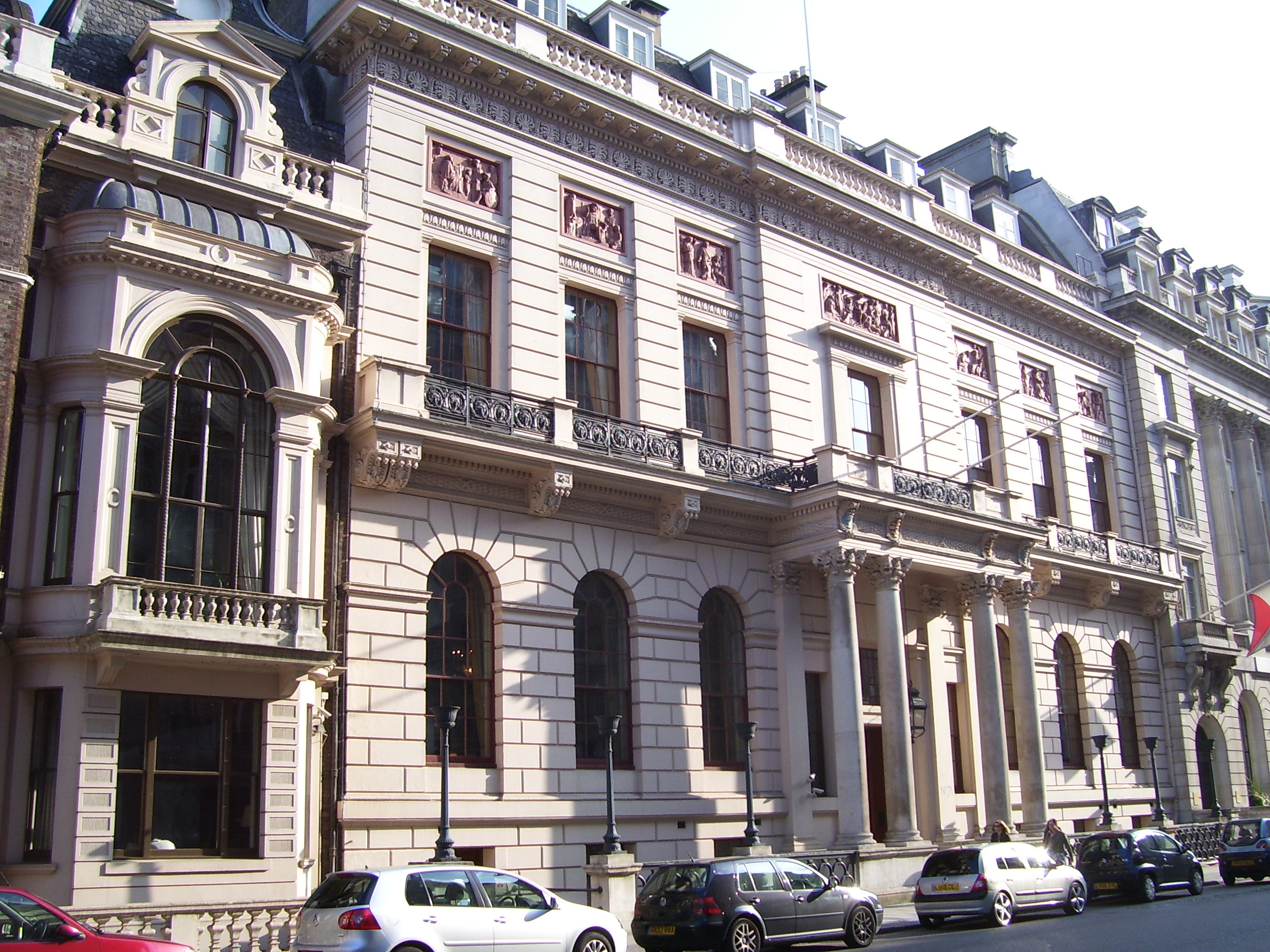
The Oxford and Cambridge Club

The Oxford and Cambridge Club building in Pall Mall (1835–38). It is of seven bays, the ground floor is rusticated with round headed windows, the first floor is of banded rustication and the windows framed with square or half pillars, the building is of brick covered with stucco. The first floor windows have carved relieves above them, the entrance porch is of a single storey with Corinthian columns. The interiors are in Smirke's usual restrained Greek revival style.

=== No. 12 Belgrave Square ===
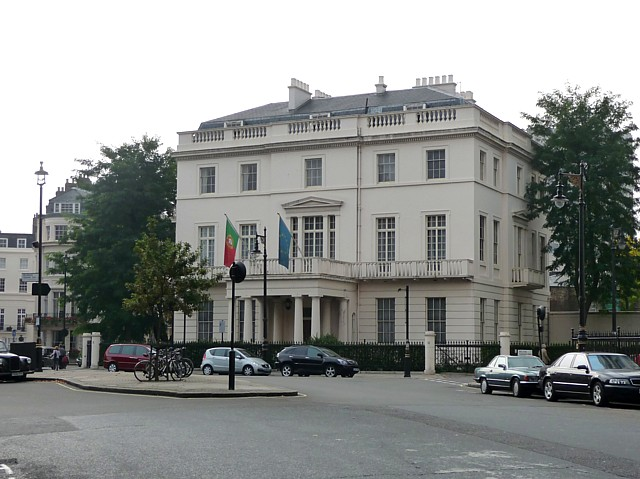
No.12 Belgrave Square

Belgrave Square: Smirke designed No. 12 Belgrave square, built 1830–1833 for John Cust, 1st Earl Brownlow.

=== London churches ===
For Smirke's London churches see Church Architecture below.

== Public buildings outside London ==
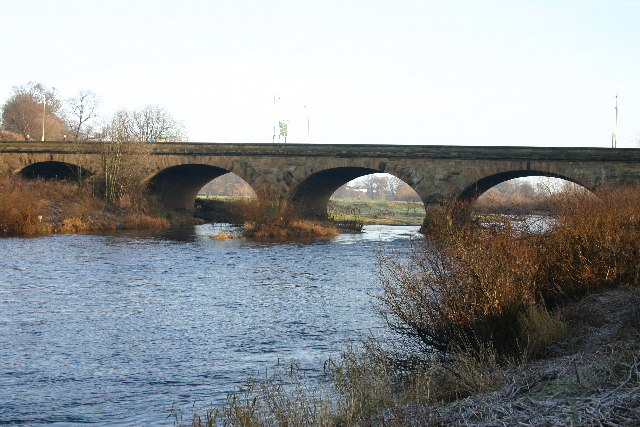
Eden Bridge Carlisle

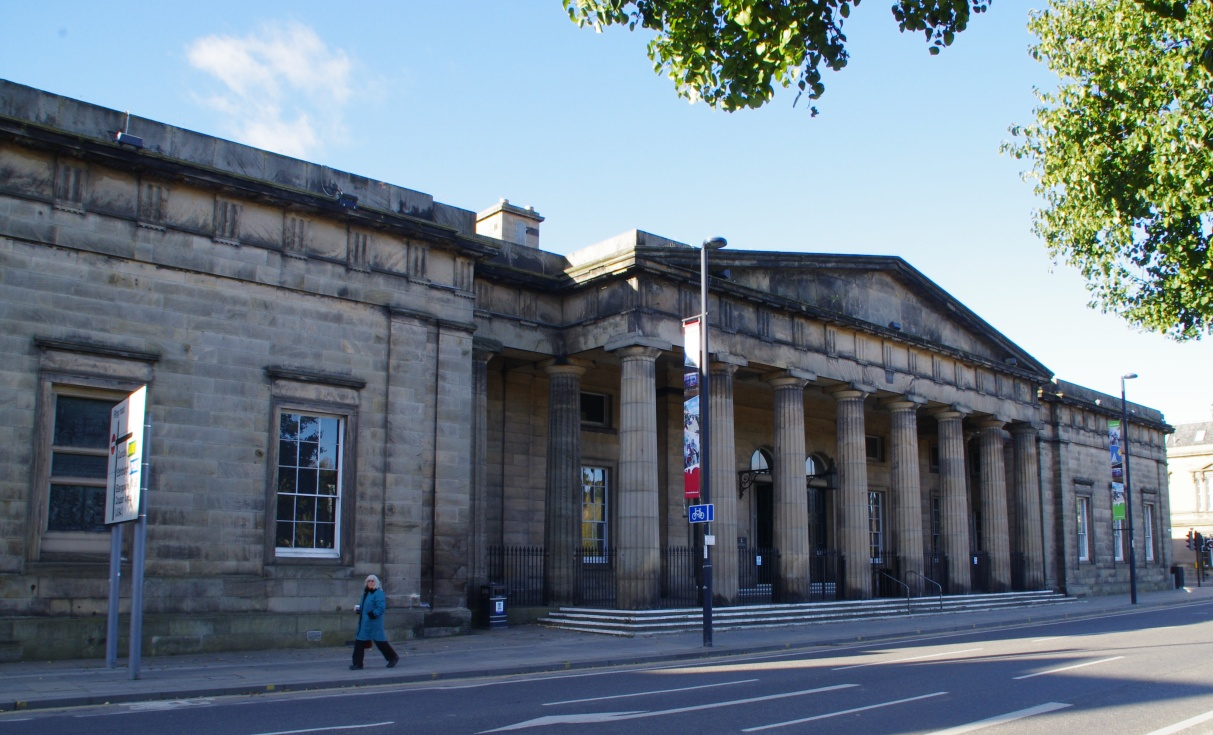
Perth Sheriff Court

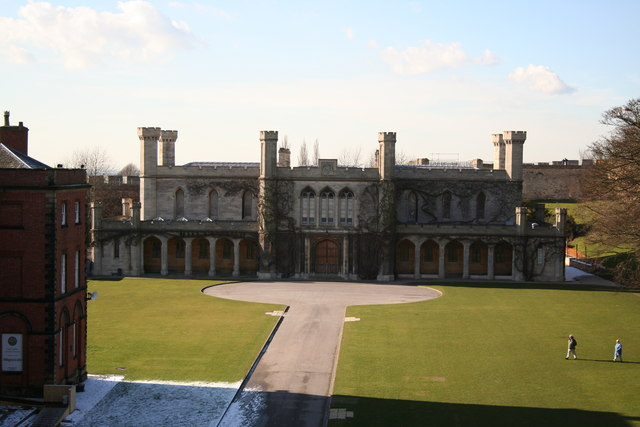
Courts Lincoln Castle

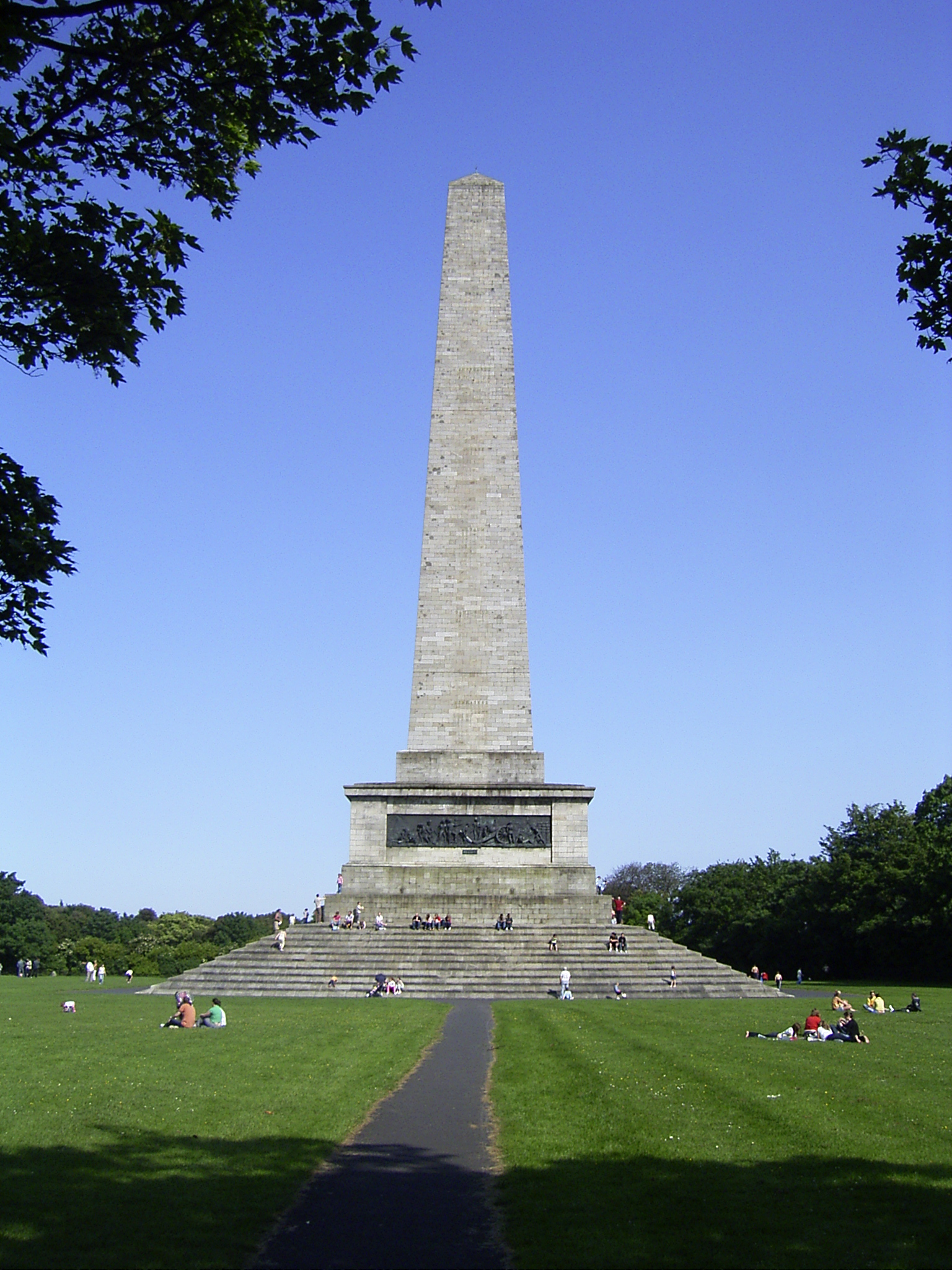
Wellington Testimonial

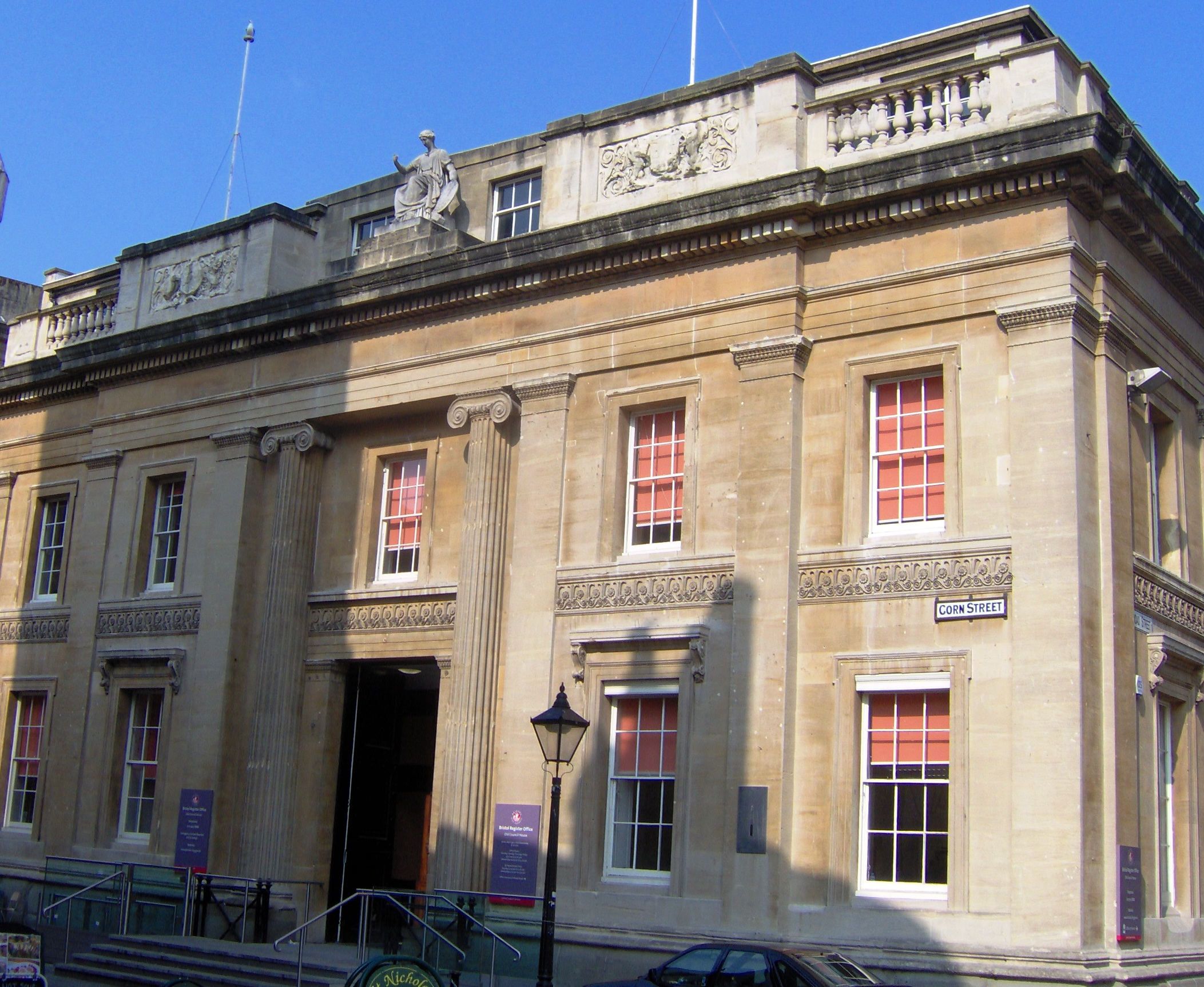
Old Council House, Bristol

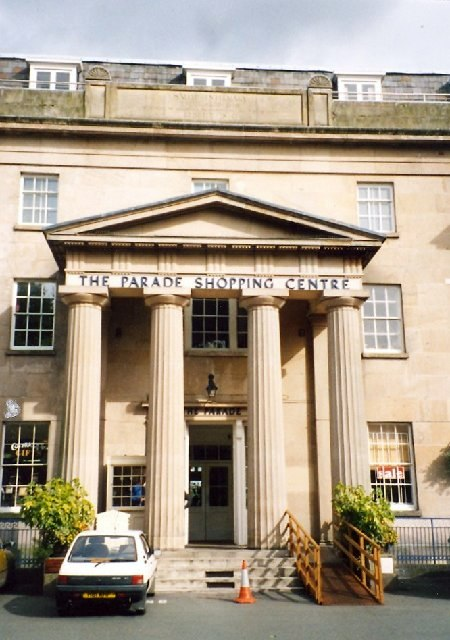
Former Salop Infirmary, Shrewsbury

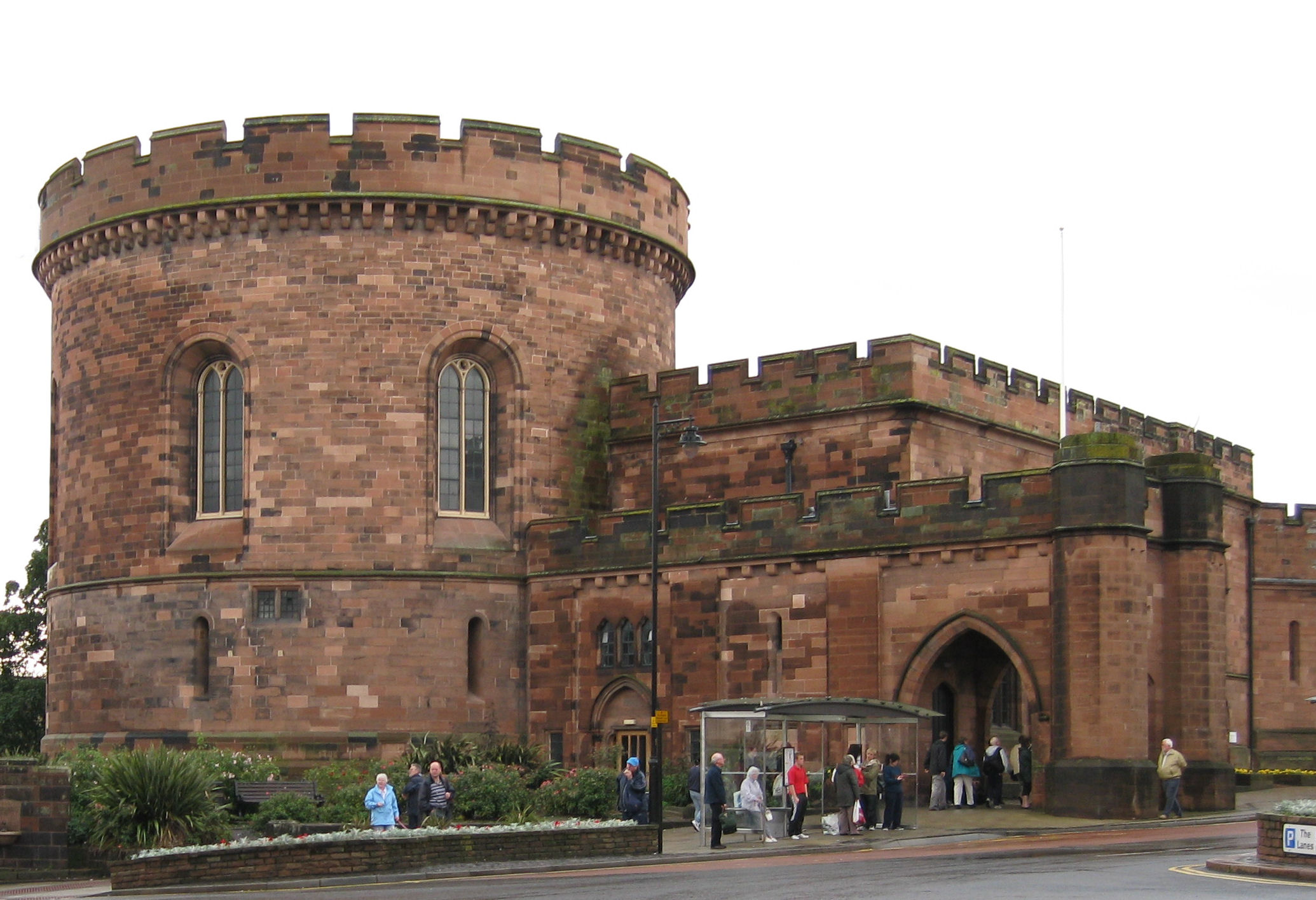
Former County Courts, Carlisle

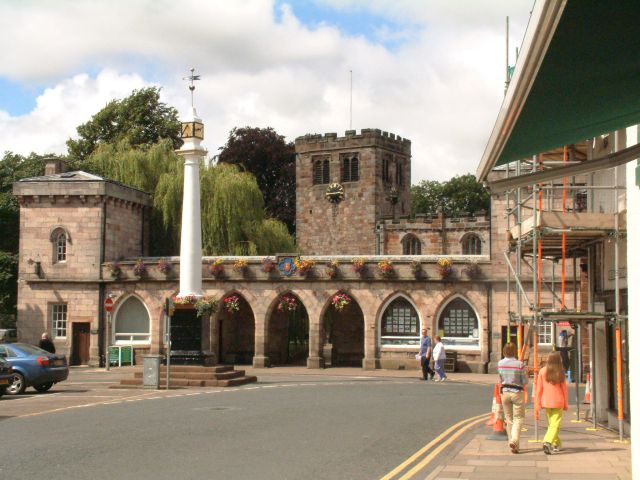
The former Market House, Appleby

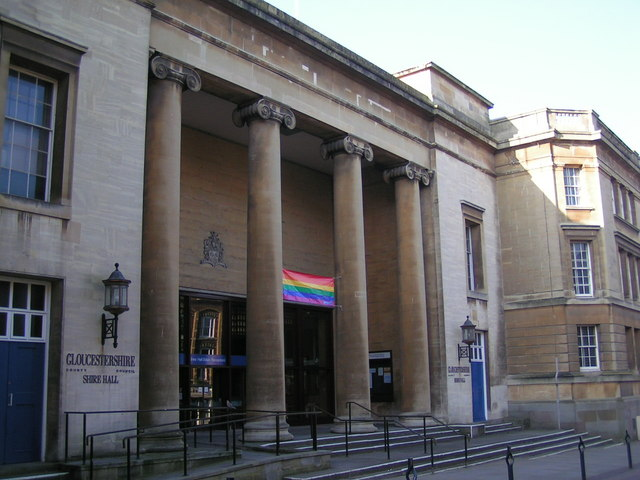
Gloucester Shire Hall

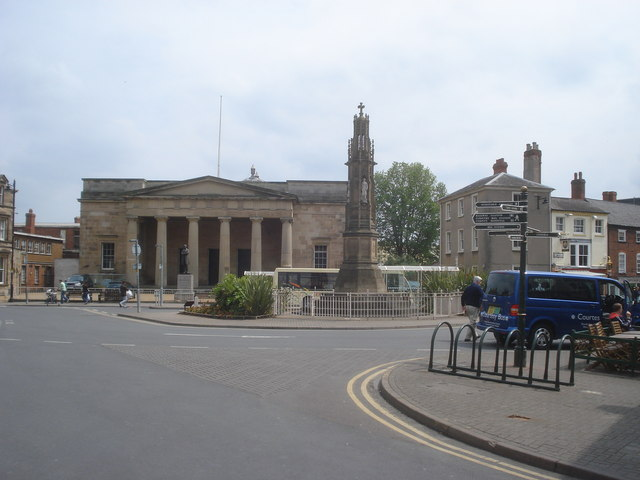
Hereford Shire Hall

His public buildings outside London include:

- Carlisle, Cumberland County Courts (1810–12), in a Gothic style.
- Appleby Market House (1811).
- Carlisle, The Eden Bridge (1812–15) widened in 1932.
- Whitehaven Fish Market (1813) demolished c. 1852, and Butter Market (1813) demolished 1880.
- Gloucester Shire Hall (1814–16).
- Gloucester, Westgate Bridge (1814–17)
- Perth Sheriff Court (1815–19)
- Hereford Shirehall (1815–17).
- the Wellington Monument, Dublin (Wellington Testimonial), started in 1817 it was only completed in 1861, at 203 feet (62 m) it is the largest obelisk in Europe.
- Maidstone County Gaol, (1817–19).
- Maidstone Sessions House (1824) (now known as County Hall).
- Ledbury St. Katherine's Hospital (1822–25) in a Gothic style.
- Lincoln County Courts and Gaol in Lincoln Castle (1823–30) both in a Gothic style to harmonise with the castle.
- Salop Infirmary, Shrewsbury, rebuild (1827–30), consulting architect.
- Shrewsbury Shire Hall (1834–37) demolished 1971.

== Domestic architecture ==
Brightling Observatory

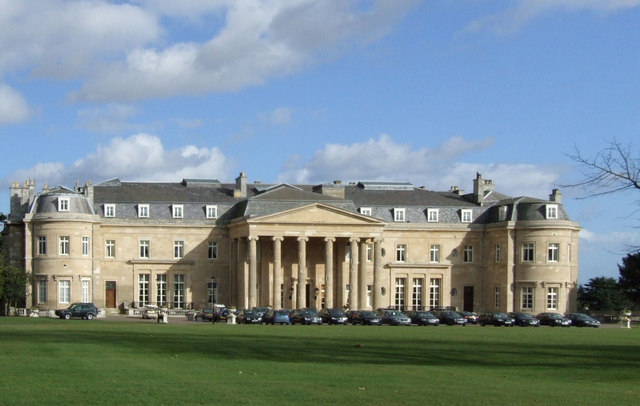
Luton Hoo

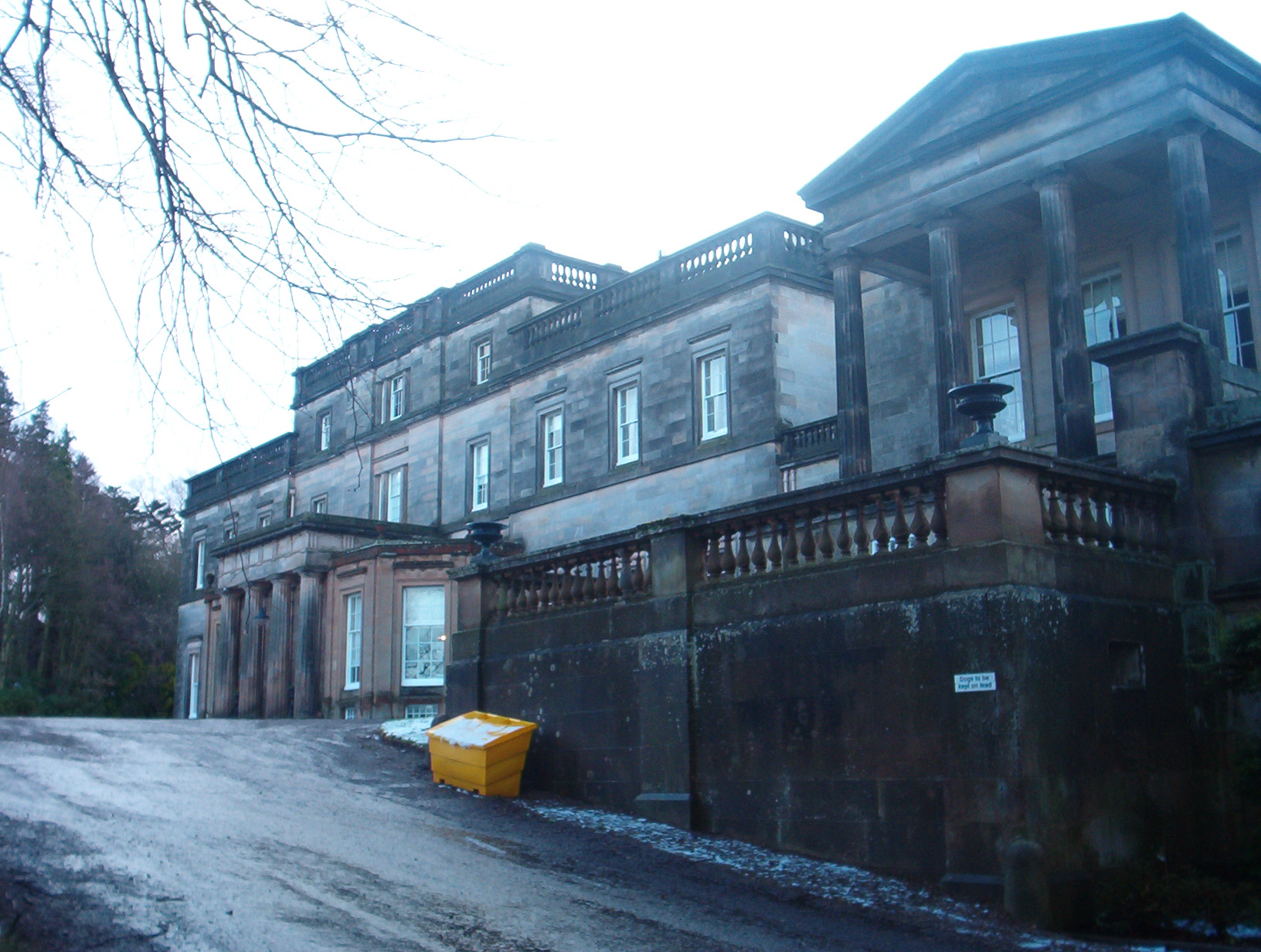
Whittingehame House

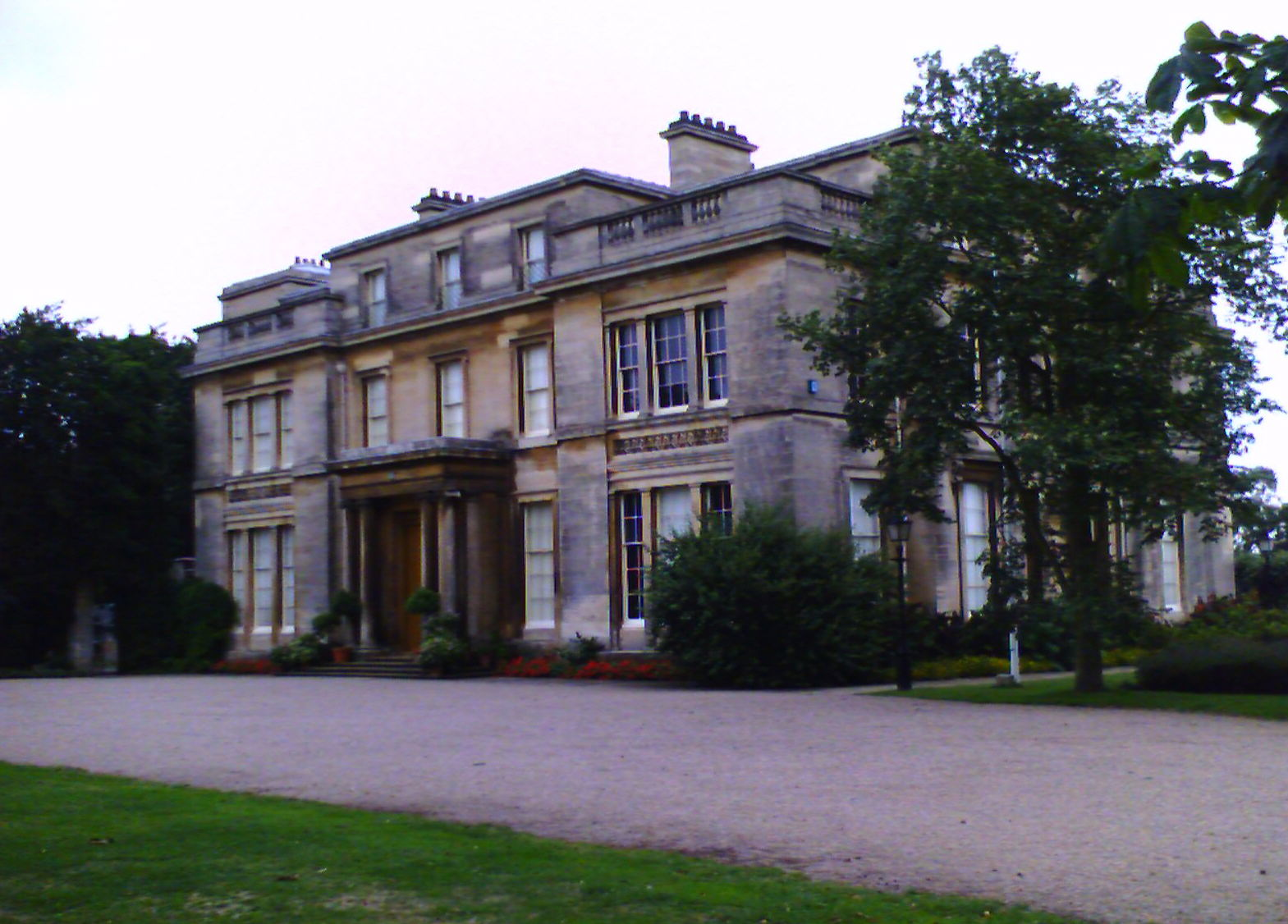
Normanby Hall

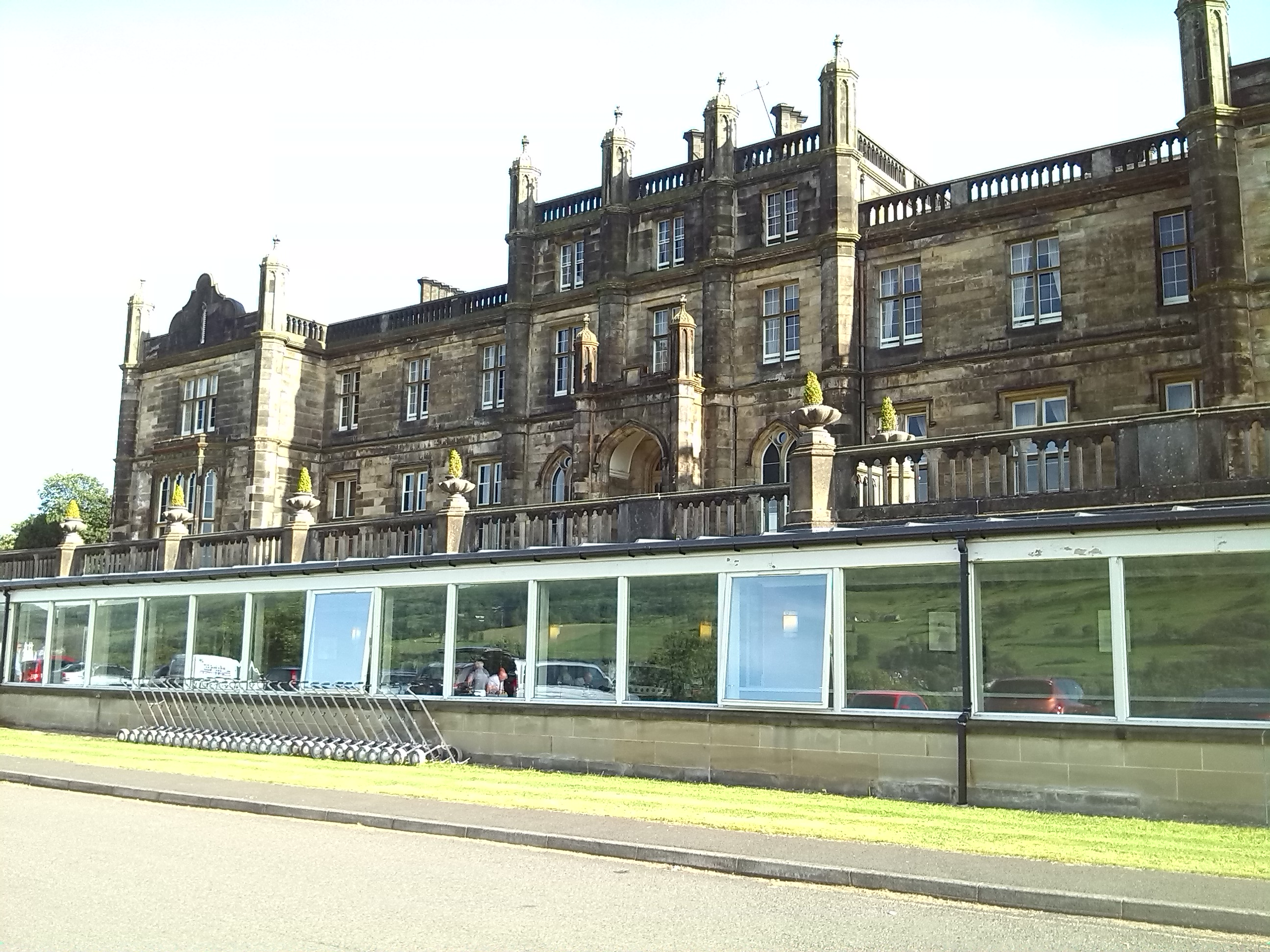
Erskine House

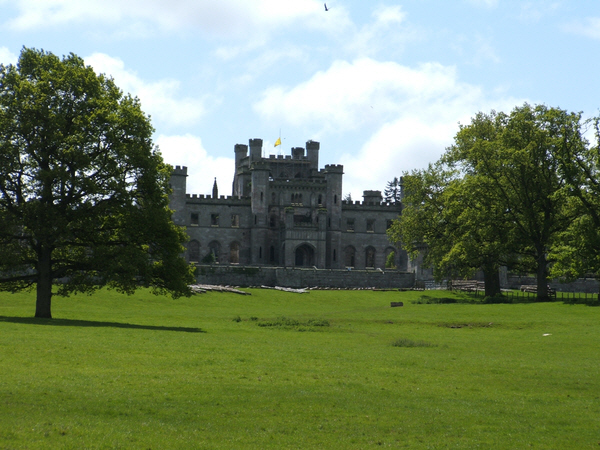
Lowther Castle

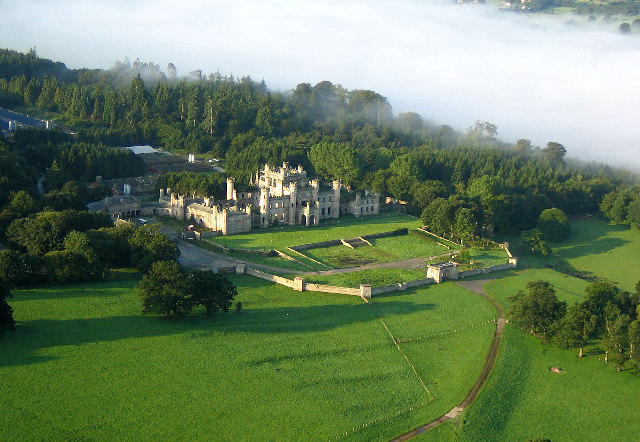
Lowther Castle

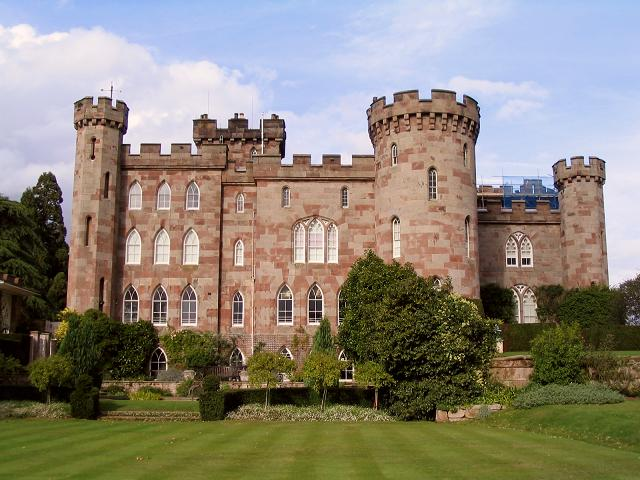
Cholmondeley Castle

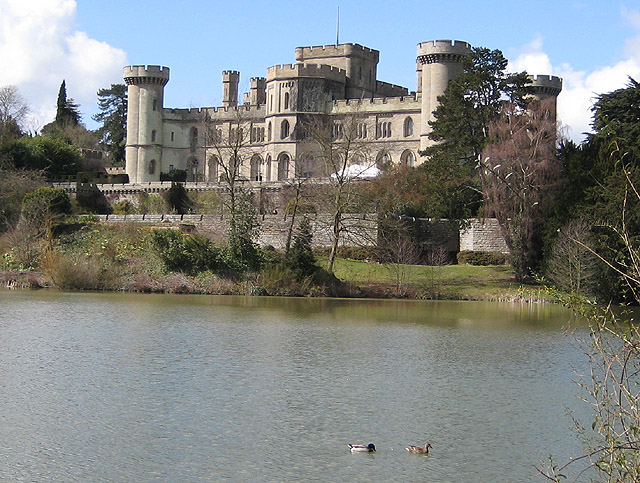
Eastnor Castle

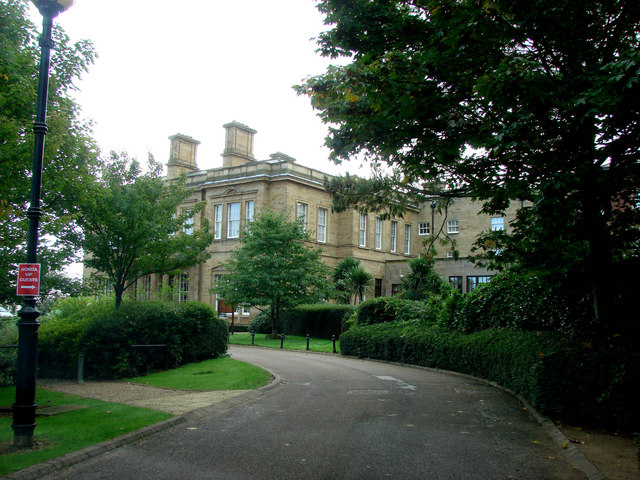
Oulton Hall

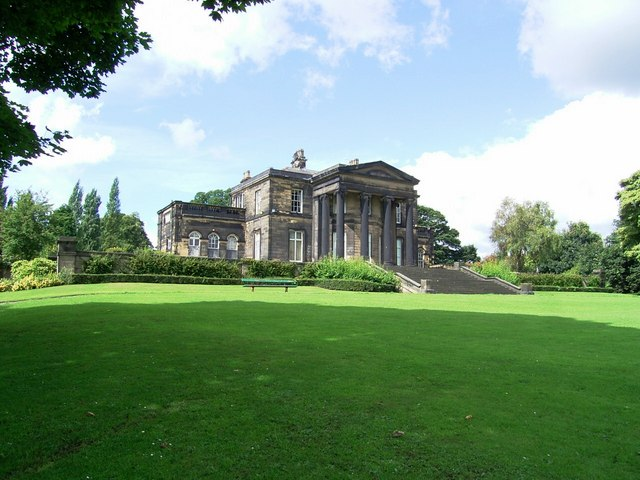
Armley House

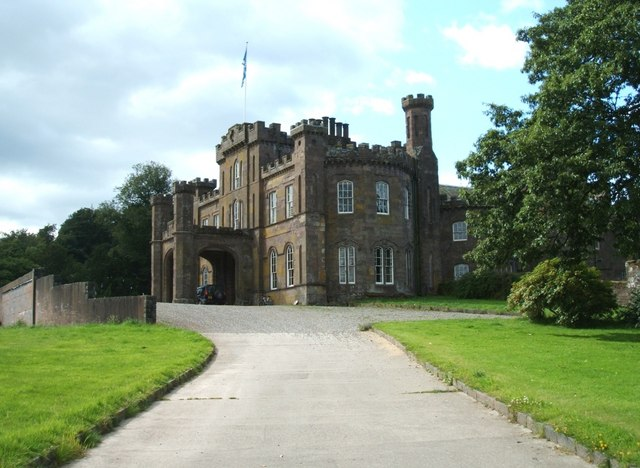
Strathallan Castle

In the classical style:

- Brightling Park west wing, observatory and follies (temple, obelisk) c. 1800–10
- Eywood, Herefordshire, (1806–07) major extension, demolished 1955
- Upleatham Hall, North Riding, Yorkshire (1810) extension, demolished 1897
- Bickley Hall, Kent, (1810) extension of large library wing, demolished 1963
- Cirencester House north wing (1810–11) and rebuilt east front 1830.
- alterations to Luton Hoo, Bedfordshire from 1816, damaged by fire in 1843 it was reconstructed by Sydney Smirke.
- Armley House, Yorkshire, (1817).
- Whittingehame House, East Lothian (1817–18).
- Haffield House, Donnington, Herefordshire (1817–18).
- Hardwicke Court, near Gloucester (1817–19).
- Oulton Hall (c. 1822) damaged by fire 1850 and restored by Sydney Smirke
- Normanby Hall (1825–30)

Smirke used the Elizabethan Style at:

- Drayton Manor (1831–35) demolished 1919.

His Gothic Revival domestic buildings include:

- Lowther Castle in Cumbria, (in 1806–11) his first major commission when he was 26.
- Offley Place, Hertfordshire, (1806–10)
- Wilton Castle (Yorkshire) (1810)
- Strathallan Castle, Perthshire, remodelled (1817–18)
- Cholmondeley Castle (1817–19) a remodelling of the existing building.
- Kinfauns Castle, Perthshire (1822–26)
- Erskine House (1828–45)

A rare use of Norman Revival Architecture is:

- Eastnor Castle, Ledbury, Herefordshire (1812–20)

== Church architecture ==
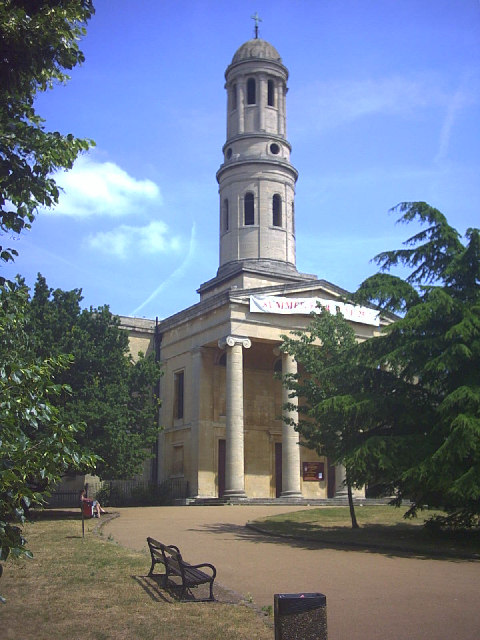
St Anne's Church, Wandsworth

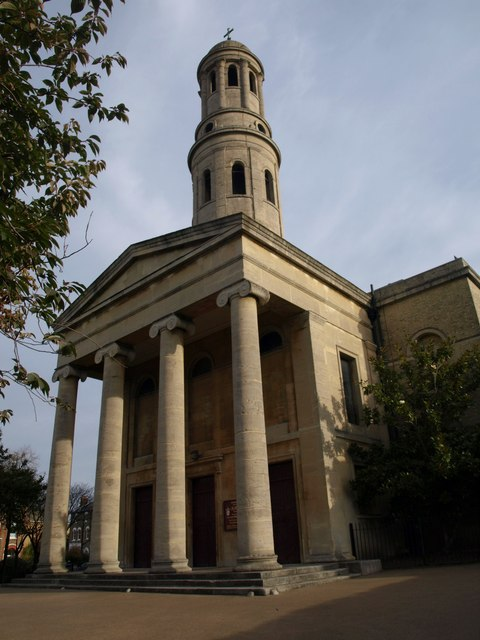
St Anne's Church, Wandsworth

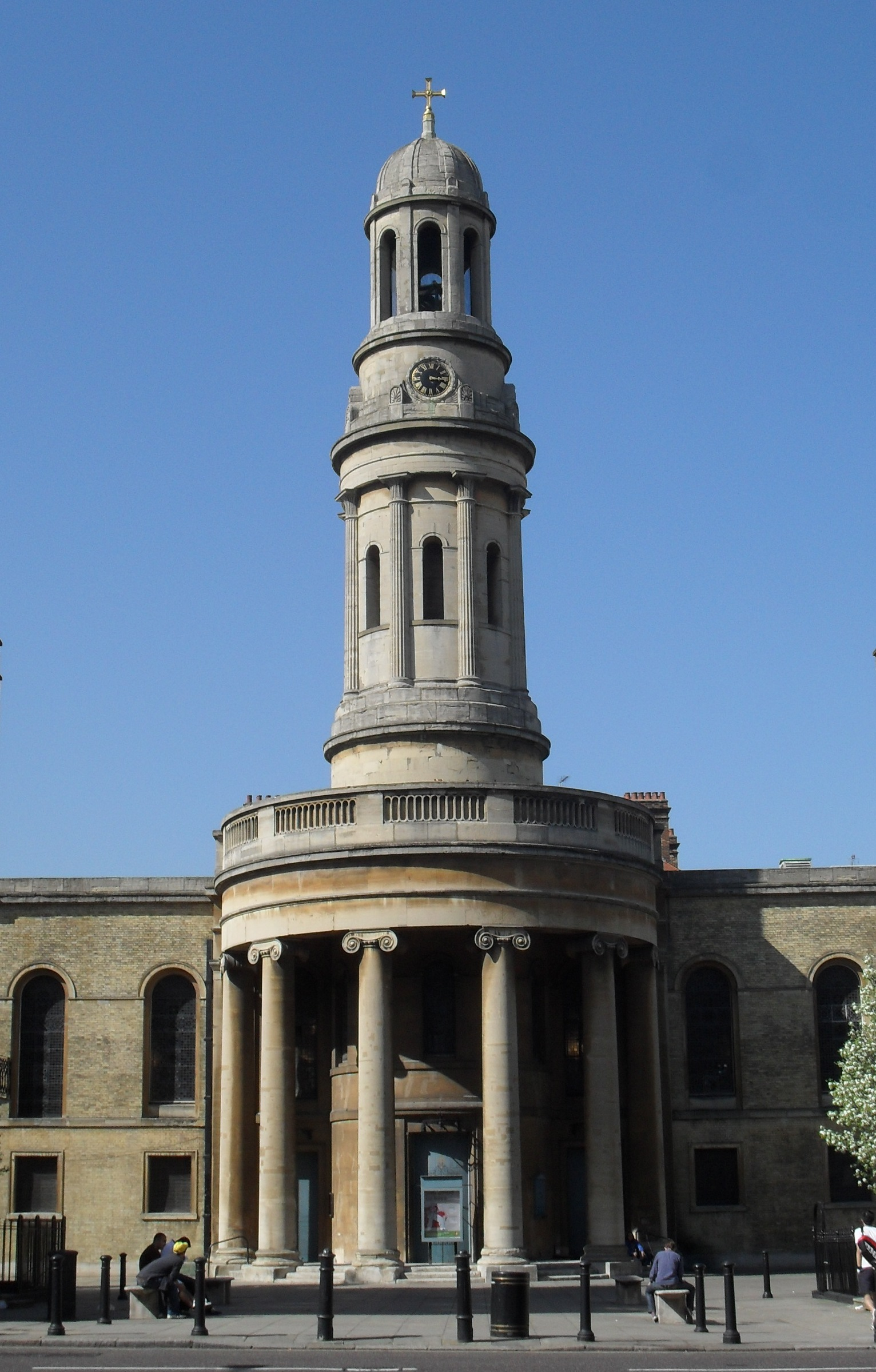
St Mary's Church, Bryanston Square

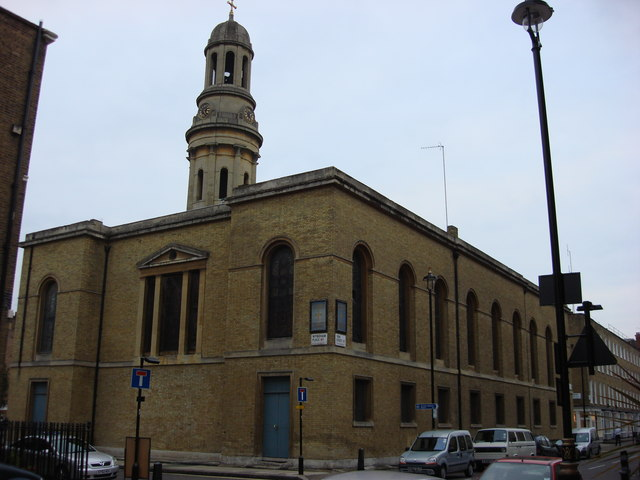
St Mary's Church, Bryanston Square

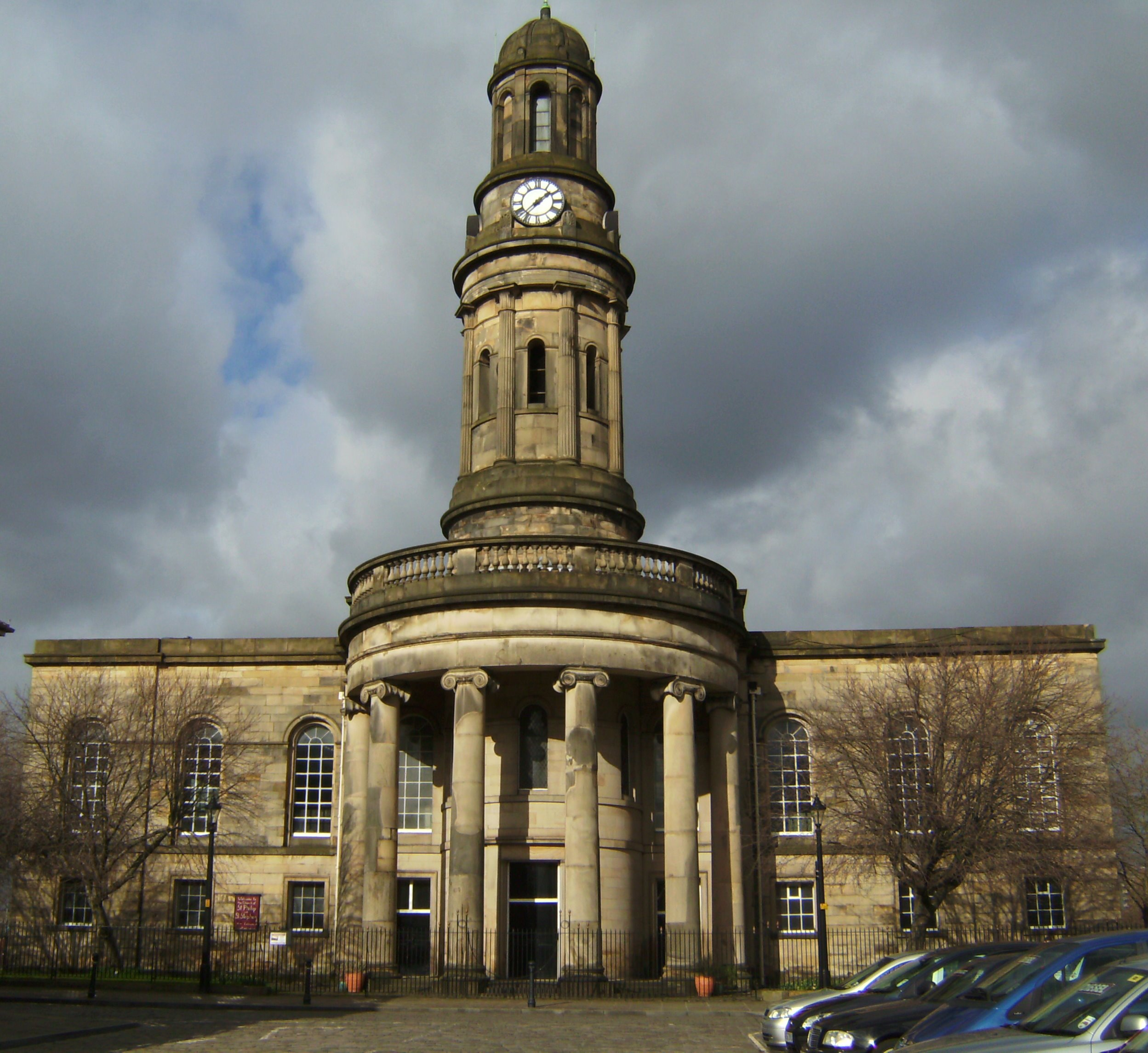
St Philip's Church, Salford

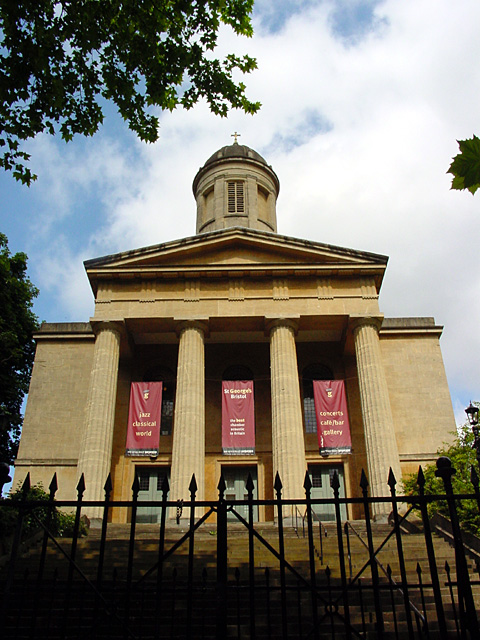
St George's Church, Brandon Hill

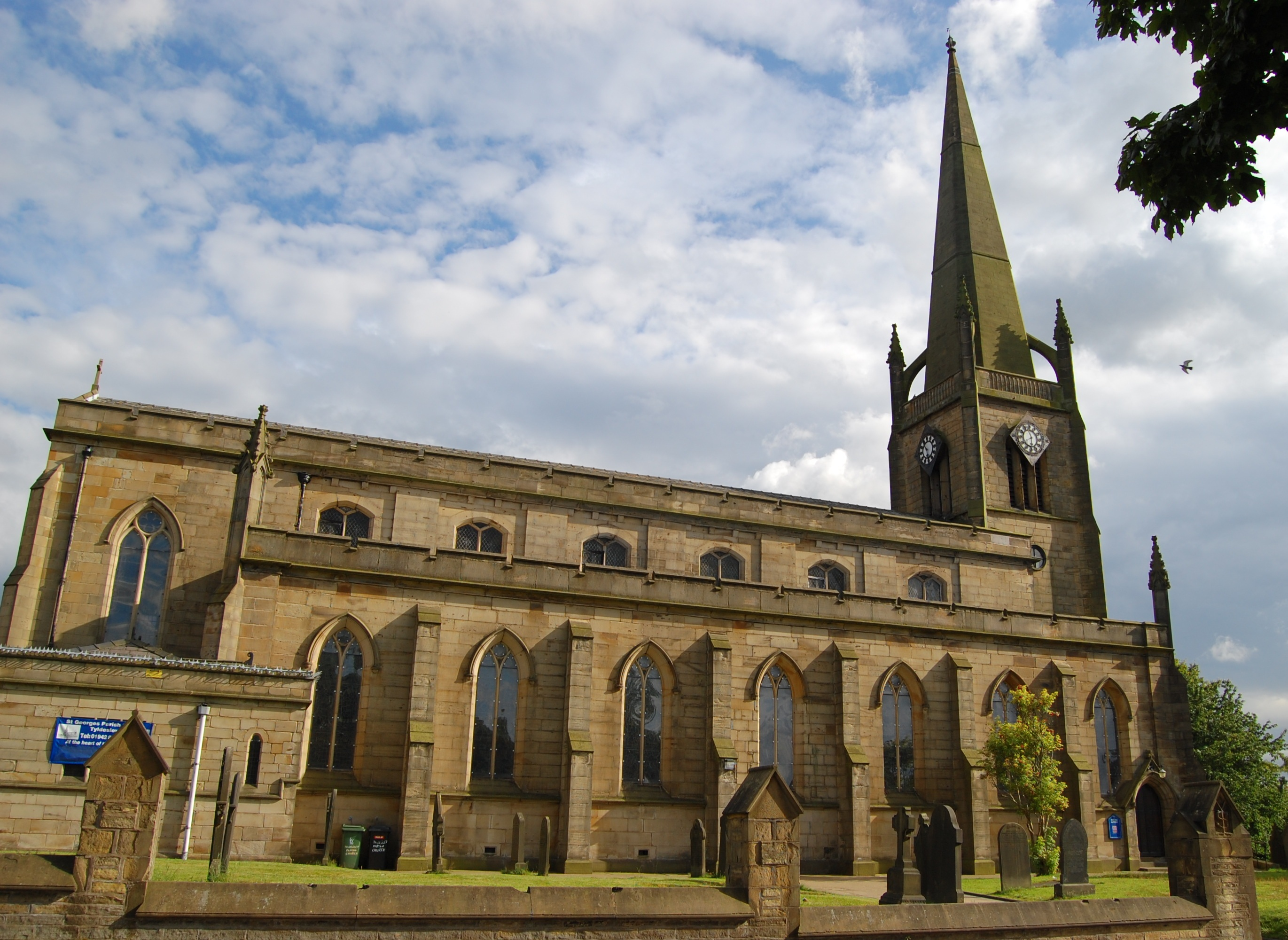
St George's Church, Tyldesley

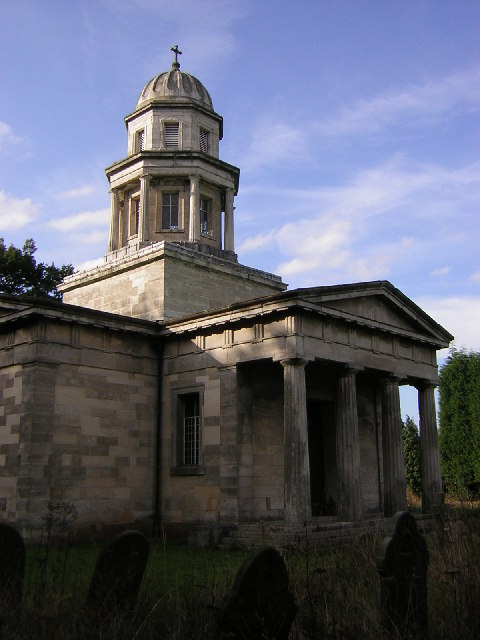
The Mausoleum Milton

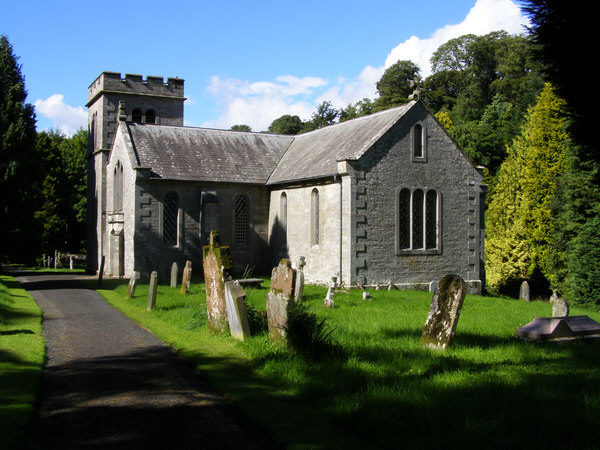
St Peter's Church, Askham

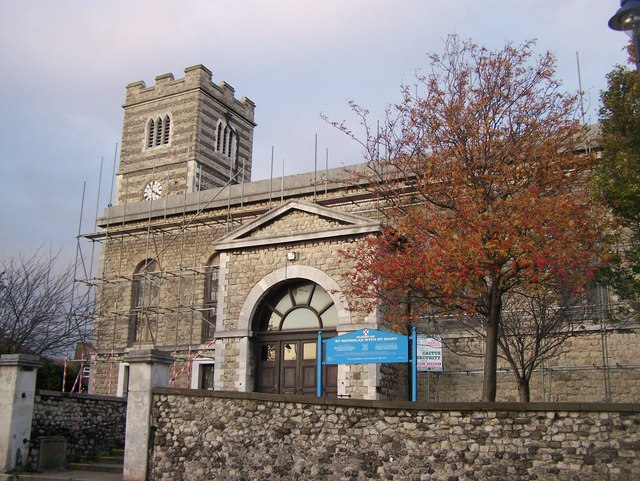
St Nicholas's Church, Strood

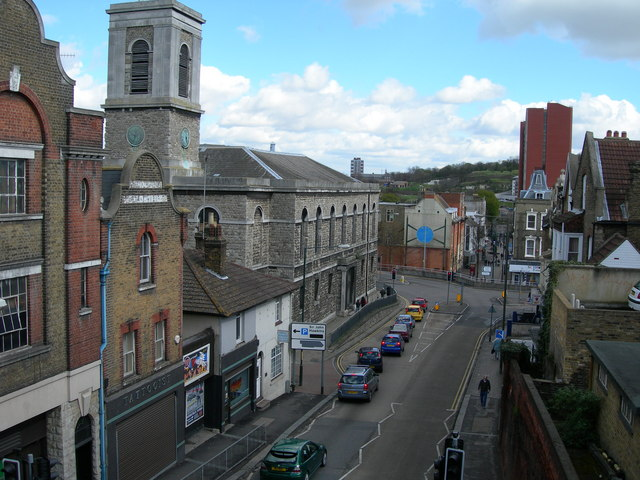
St John's Church, Chatham

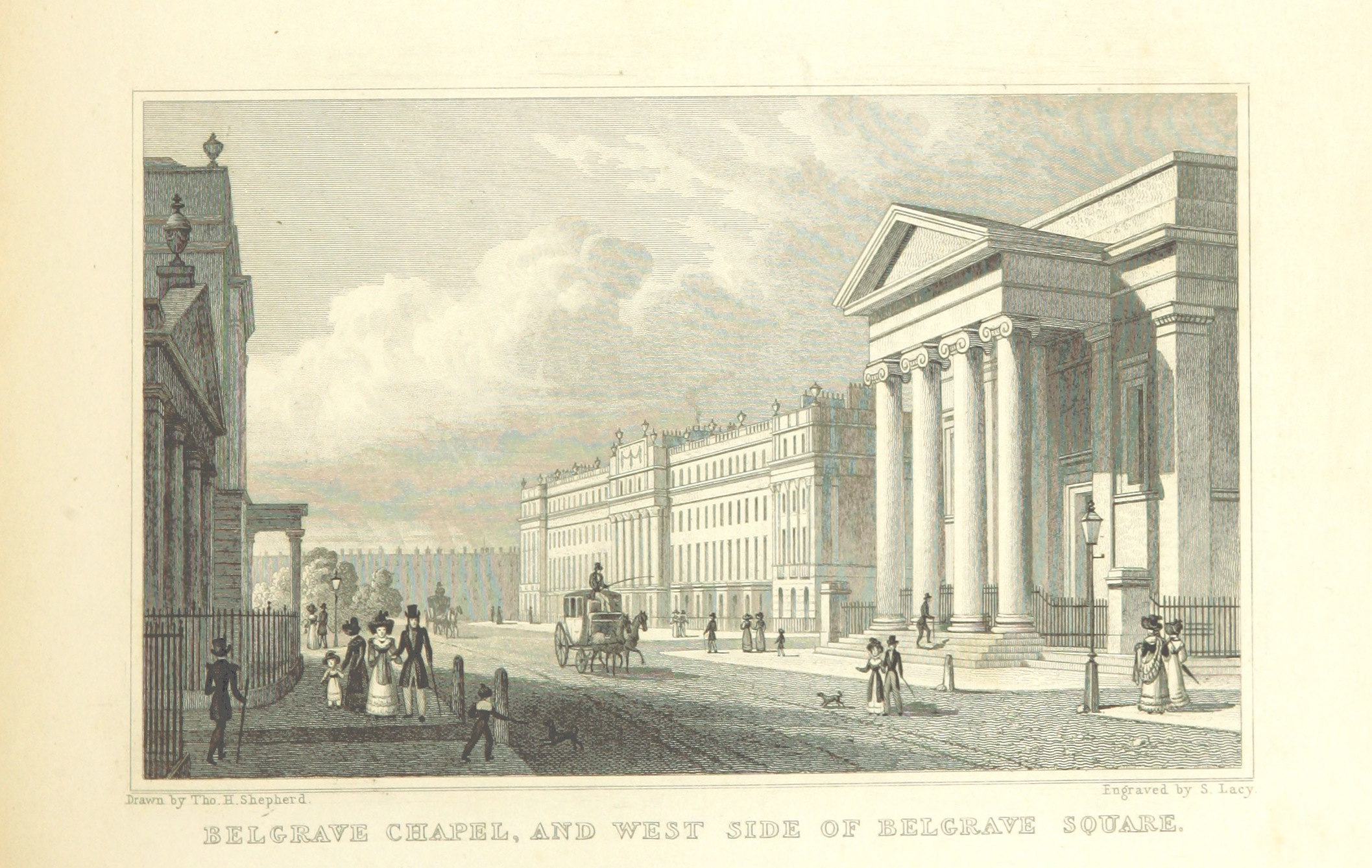
Belgrave Chapel on the right, demolished c. 1910

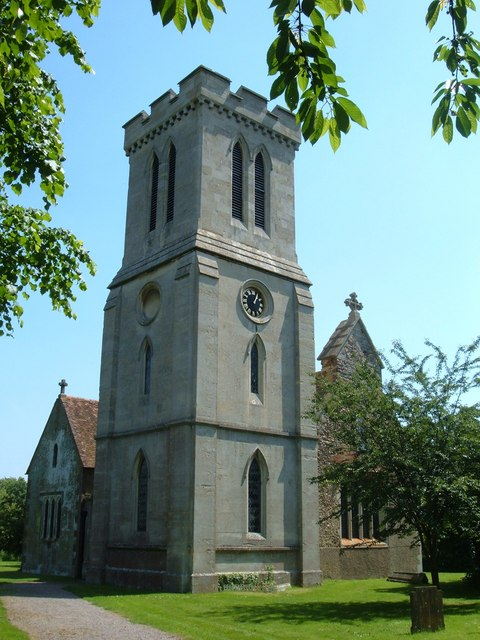
St Peter's Church, Milton Bryan

He advised the Parliamentary Commissioners on the building of new churches from 1818 onwards, contributing seven himself, six were in the Greek revival style, the exception being the church at Tyldesley that is in the Gothic revival style:

- St Anne's, Wandsworth (1820–22).
- St John's, Chatham, Kent (1821–22).
- St James, West Hackney (1821–3) bombed during The Blitz in 1940 and 1941 and later demolished.
- St George, Brandon Hill, Bristol (1821–23).
- St George, Tyldesley (1821–4).
- St Mary's, Bryanston Square, London (1821–3).
- St Philip's Church, Salford, Greater Manchester (1822–4); a copy of St Mary's with only minor variations.

Smirke also designed churches for clients other than the commissioners, these included:

- Belgrave Chapel, London 1812, demolished c. 1910.
- St Nicholas Strood, this was a rebuilding in 1812 of a medieval church, the tower of which has been retained, and is in a simplified classical style.
- The Milton Mausoleum at Milton, Nottinghamshire (1831–32) for Henry Pelham-Clinton, 4th Duke of Newcastle.
- The parish church of St. Peter's at Askham, Cumbria 1832, in a Neo-Norman style.
- The Church of St Peter, Milton Bryan, Bedfordshire addition of north transept to church by Lewis Nockalls Cottingham.

== Restoration work ==
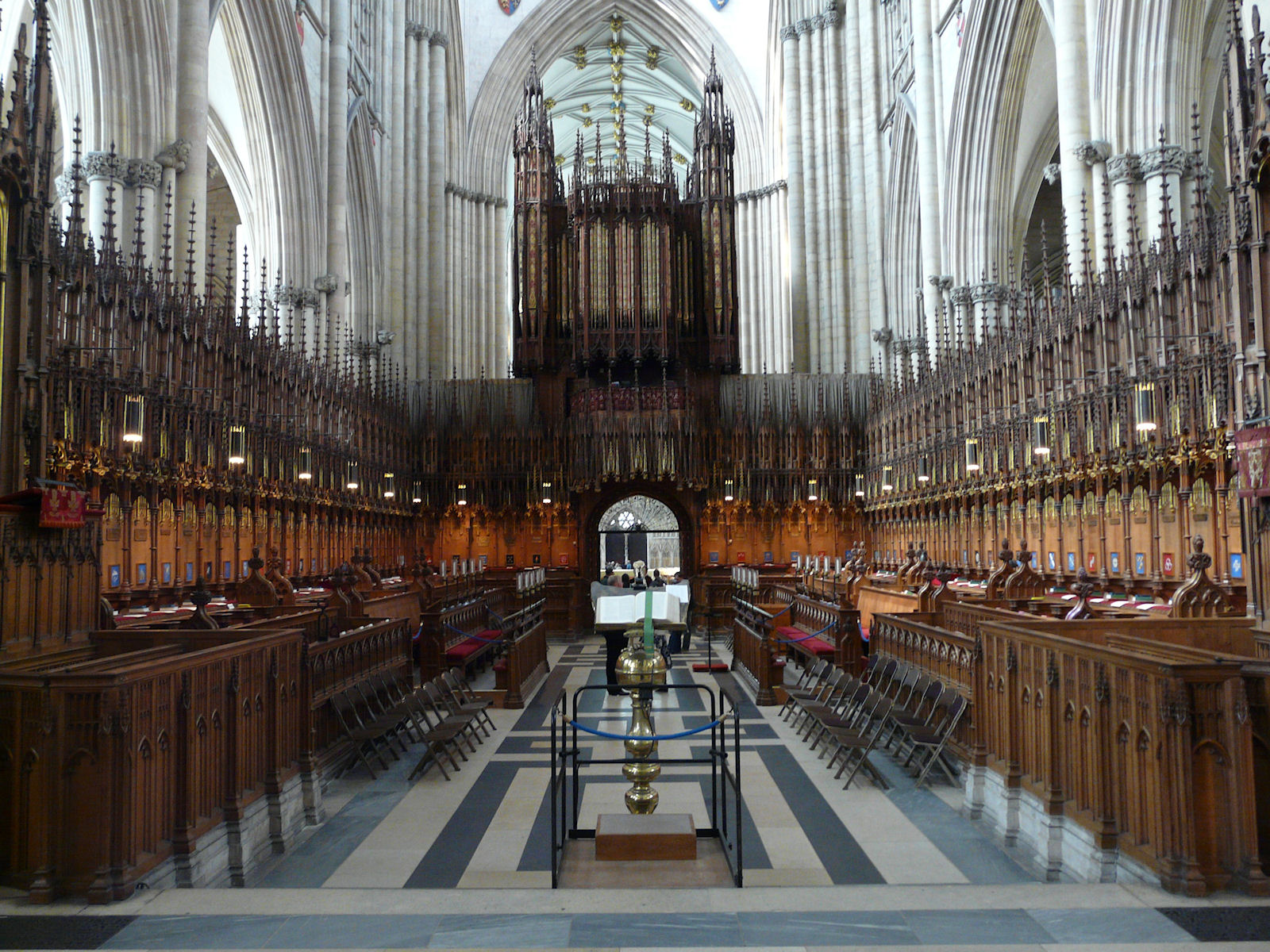
The choir stalls, York Minster, Smirke's recreation of the original ones, 1830–32

Smirke was involved in Building restoration, several commissions coming to him via his post in the Office of Works:

- Gloucester Cathedral (1807), Gothic screen behind the high altar; removed 1873.
- Carlisle Cathedral (1809–11), repairs and alterations to the Fratry.
- Powis Castle (1815–18), restoration of battlements, window mullions etc.
- Savoy Chapel (1820–21), rebuilt south wall and added the west tower.
- Bodleian Library, Oxford (1830) repaired the roof and inserted a new ceiling in the upper reading room in the schools quadrangle.
- Clarendon Building, Oxford (1831) fitted up the interior as university offices.
- York Minster after the arson attack on the chancel of the cathedral in 1829, Smirke oversaw the restoration (1830–32), which involved rebuilding the roof and vaults plus the recreation of the choir stalls
- Palace of Westminster, (1834–37) he refaced the interior of Westminster Hall after the fire of 1834 and erected a temporary House of Lords in the Painted Chamber and a temporary House of Commons in the remains of the former House of Lords.
- Banqueting House, Whitehall (1835–38) repairs and internal alterations.
- Mansion House, London (1836), redesign of the external steps to the portico.
- St. James's Palace (1836–37) refitted the interior of the Chapel Royal.
- St James's Church, Piccadilly (1836), repairs to the roof
- Serjeant's Inn (1836–39) extensive reconstruction work, destroyed 1940 during the London Blitz.

== In popular culture ==
- Smirke and his architecture are featured extensively in the horror fiction podcast The Magnus Archives.
