= Sir Archibald White, 4th Baronet =

English county cricketer (1877–1945)

Sir Archibald Woollaston White, 4th Baronet, MFH (14 October 1877 – 16 December 1945), was the son of William Knight Hamilton White, the second son of Sir Thomas White, 2nd Baronet. He was born at Tickhill in Yorkshire, where he lived throughout his childhood. He succeeded to the baronetcy upon the death of his uncle (his father's elder brother), Sir Thomas White, 3rd Baronet, in 1907.

== Education ==
Sir Archibald was educated at Wellington College, where he was captain of cricket and rugby, as well as a school prefect. After school he went up to Trinity Hall, Cambridge, where he got his degree and played cricket for his college.

== Family ==
In 1903 White married Gladys Love Becher Pitman, the daughter of Rev. Augustus Bracken Pitman, the Rector of Stonegrave near Malton in North Yorkshire. After his succession to the baronetcy in 1907 she was known as Lady White.

=== Children of Sir Archibald and Lady White ===
| Name | Born | Died |
|---|---|---|
| Sir Thomas Astley Woollaston White, 5th Baronet | 13 May 1904 | 16 May 1996 |
| Captain Richard Taylor White, RN DSO** | 29 January 1908 | 3 March 1995 |
| Captain Archibald John Ramsay White, RN CBE DSC | 17 September 1910 | 4 December 1991 |

== Cricket career ==
Sir Archibald was an English amateur first-class cricketer, who captained Yorkshire County Cricket Club from 1911 to 1914. He led the team to the County Championship title in 1912. He also appeared for Yorkshire (1913), the Yorkshire Second XI (1908) and York and District (1920).

White played ninety eight first-class games from 1908 to 1920, scoring 1,471 runs at an average of 14.42, with a best score of 55 against Nottinghamshire, one of four fifties in his career. He held fifty two catches, and conceded seven runs with his right arm medium pace, without taking a wicket.

He played his early cricket with Tickhill C.C. from 1893, and became their captain in 1897. He finished playing for Tickhill C.C. in 1908, but became president in 1910.

White ended his captaincy of Yorkshire County Cricket Club on 4 August 1914 in the middle of a Bank Holiday match between Yorkshire and Lancashire, when he left to join his battery at the outbreak of the First World War.

His uncle, William Humble, played briefly for Derbyshire.

== Army service ==
From 1897 to 1908 White held a commission with the Yorkshire Artillery Militia, a part-time militia regiment based in Scarborough, North Yorkshire. He was promoted to lieutenant on 8 March 1899. During the Second Boer War (1899–1902) a number of militia officers were seconded for active service replacing those officers serving in South Africa, and White served with the Royal Artillery from March 1900.

=== First World War ===
Thereafter he joined the Nottinghamshire Royal Horse Artillery, a Territorial battery commanded by Sir Joseph Lacock of Wiseton. The regiment was officered by local gentry, who used their own hunters as chargers.

==== Gallipoli ====
The battery was shipped off to Egypt in March 1915, with Sir Archibald holding the rank of Captain. In August 1915 the battery took part in the landing at Suvla Bay during the Gallipoli campaign.

==== Senussi campaign ====
The Battery returned to Egypt in November 1915 before participating in the Senussi campaign in December 1915. This raid was organised by the Duke of Westminster with his armoured car Battalion. Sir Archibald became extremely ill with dysentery and jaundice at this time and was shipped back down the coast to Alexandria in the hold of a cattle boat. His brother officers never expected to see him again, but his strong constitution enabled him to recover sufficiently to be shipped back to England in January 1916, where he recovered but was no longer fit for service overseas.

==== Anti-aircraft duties ====
After a period of sick leave at his seat, Wallingwells, he was posted to Leeds in April 1916 and in November 1916, he was promoted as Major 2nd in command Army Anti Aircraft, Harwich. His commanding officer was Colonel Fear, the other officers were called D'Aeth, Blood and Slaughter, who were all billeted in "Shrapnel Cottage".

After Harwich White was promoted acting Lieutenant-Colonel and moved to Birmingham in September 1917. In December 1917 he was then moved to Staines as commanding officer of the L.A.A.A. Western Barrage for the defence of London.

On 20 December 1917 (coincidentally the date of the 115th anniversary of the creation of the baronetcy for Sir Thomas White, 1st Baronet), Sir Archibald was mentioned in despatches "for valuable services...".

=== Second World War ===
In 1940 Sir Archibald took command of the local Home Guard Battalion, and entered with zest into its training and organisation.

== Hunting ==
Having inherited the baronetcy in 1907, Sir Archibald moved to his seat at Wallingwells. He started regularly hunting with the Grove, stabling three or four hunters at Wallingwells.

Having sold Wallingwells in 1926, Sir Archibald and his family moved up to Northumberland, renting a series of houses, before buying the Otterburn Tower Estate with the royalties from the coal mining at the Firbeck Main below the Wallingwells. Sir Archibald had retained the mineral rights of the Wallingwells Estate. Whilst in Northumberland, he hunted with the West Percy, becoming its Master in 1929, continuing to hunt the hounds until 1935. British Pathe have a video of the New Year's Meet in 1936 of the West Percy at Alnwick, celebrating Sir Archibald's retirement as the Hunt's Master.

== Death and succession ==
Sir Archibald died on 6 December 1945 in Dumfries Hospital, having suffered from artery problems for some time previously. His body was cremated, making him the first head of the family for many generations not to have been buried at Tuxford.

Sir Archibald was succeeded in his titles by his eldest son, Sir Thomas White, 5th Baronet.

Baronetage of the United Kingdom
| Preceded by Thomas White | Baronet (of Tuxford and Wallingwells); 1907–1945 | Succeeded by Thomas White |
