= White baronets of Tuxford and Wallingwells (1802) =

Escutcheon of the White baronets of Tuxford and Wallingwells

The White baronetcy, of Tuxford and Wallingwells in the County of Nottingham, was created in the Baronetage of the United Kingdom on 20 December 1802 for Thomas Woollaston White, with remainder to the heirs male of his father.

== White baronets, of Tuxford and Wallingwells (1802) ==
- Sir Thomas Woollaston White, 1st Baronet (1767–1817)
- Sir Thomas Woollaston White, 2nd Baronet (1801–1882)
- Sir Thomas Woollaston White, 3rd Baronet (1828–1907)
- Sir Archibald Woollaston White, 4th Baronet (1877–1945)
- Sir Thomas Astley Woollaston White, 5th Baronet (1904–1996)
- Sir Nicholas Peter Archibald White, 6th Baronet (born 1939)

The heir apparent to the baronetcy is Christopher David Nicholas White (born 1972), eldest son of the 6th Baronet.

== Title succession chart ==
Title succession chart

Title succession chart, White baronets, of Tuxford and Wallingwells.

Sir Thomas White; 1st Baronet; 1767–1817
Sir Thomas White; 2nd Baronet; 1801–1882
Sir Thomas White; 3rd Baronet; 1828–1907	William White; 1834–1900
Sir Archibald White; 4th Baronet; 1877–1945
Sir Thomas White; 5th Baronet; 1904–1996	Capt. Richard White; 1908–1995
Sir Nicholas White; 6th Baronet born 1939
Christopher White born 1972

== Notes ==
Baronetage of the United Kingdom
Preceded by Braithwaite baronets	White baronets of Tuxford and Wallingwells; 20 December 1802	Succeeded by Metcalfe baronets
