= St Peter's Church, Letwell =

Anglican church in Letwell, South Yorkshire, England

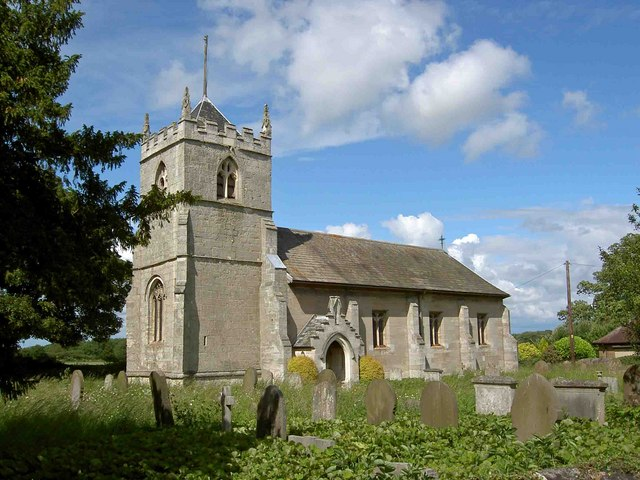
- St Peter's Church, Letwell
- 53.3774°N 1.1605°W
- OS grid reference: SK 55947 87052
- Denomination: Church of England
- Churchmanship: Broad Church

History
- Dedication: St. Peter

Administration
- Province: York
- Diocese: Sheffield
- Archdeaconry: Doncaster
- Parish: Firbeck with Letwell and Woodsetts

St Peter's Church, Letwell, is a parish church of the Church of England in Letwell.

== Background ==
The Church of St Peter is found at the west end of the village of Letwell, near Rotherham, in South Yorkshire. The church was built around 1375 by John Mauleverer, but has been substantially altered several times. Much of the church was later rebuilt in 1820, at the expense of Henry Gally Knight FRS, the owner of Firbeck Hall, but was largely destroyed by fire a few decades later.

The church today consists of the 14th century tower with a Victorian nave and apse. It is Grade II* listed.

== 1867 fire ==
The tower, along with the vestry are all that remain of the church following a fire which occurred in 1867. The fire was inadvertently started by one Harry Radley, who was sexton at the time. In response to complaints from the parishioners that they were too cold, he had over-stoked the coal-fired boiler which led to the fire.

The church was re-built and decorated in its current form at the expense of Sir Thomas White, 2nd Baronet, the son of the famous soldier Sir Thomas White, 1st Baronet, of Tuxford and Wallingwells, who twice raised the Sherwood Rangers Yeomanry Cavalry at his own expense. Much of the decoration in the church was contributed by Sir Thomas' daughters.

== Organ ==
The church is unusual as it still uses a harmonium instead of an organ. The harmonium, dating from the 19th century, was constructed by the Estey Organ Company of Brattleboro, Vermont.

== Churchyard ==
The churchyard is a designated Grade III Botanical site.

== Current use ==
It is part of the Diocese of Sheffield, now under the joint Benefice of St Martin, Firbeck, with St Peter, Letwell and St George, Woodsetts and holds worship every Sunday, alternating Matins and Evensong.

== See also ==
- Grade II* listed buildings in South Yorkshire
- Listed buildings in Letwell
