= Royal Sherwood Foresters Militia =

Auxiliary unit of the British Army

Nottinghamshire Militia Royal Sherwood Foresters 4th Battalion, Sherwood Foresters
- Active: 1558–1 April 1953
- Country: England (1558–1707); Kingdom of Great Britain (1707–1800); United Kingdom (1801–1953)
- Branch: Militia/Special Reserve
- Role: Infantry
- Size: 1 Battalion
- Part of: Sherwood Foresters
- Garrison/HQ: Nottingham Castle; Newark Town Hall; Newark Corn Exchange
- Nicknames: Nottinghamshire Marksmen; Saucy Notts
- Mottos: Pro legibus et libertate ('For law and liberty'); Loyalté ('Loyalty')
- March: Bold Robin Hood was a Forester good (Koenig)
- Engagements: Second Boer War

Commanders
- Notable commanders: Lord George Manners-Sutton; Col Lancelot Rolleston; Lt-Col William Mellish

The Royal Sherwood Foresters, originally the Nottinghamshire Militia, was an auxiliary regiment of the British Army from the English Midland county of Nottinghamshire. From its formal organisation as Trained Bands in 1558 until its final service in the Special Reserve, the Militia regiment of the county carried out internal security and home defence duties in all of Britain's major wars. It became a battalion of the Sherwood Foresters regiment in 1881 and fought in the Second Boer War, where the whole battalion was captured at the Rhenoster River bridge. It then trained thousands of reservists and recruits during World War I. It maintained a shadowy existence until final disbandment in 1953.

== Early history ==
The English militia was descended from the Anglo-Saxon Fyrd, the military force raised from the freemen of the shires under command of their Sheriffs. It continued under the Norman kings, and was reorganised under the Assizes of Arms of 1181 and 1252, and again by King Edward I's Statute of Winchester of 1285.

Nottinghamshire levies are first mentioned when they served under William de Peverel at the Battle of the Standard against the Scots in the 1138. By the end of the 13th Century the Nottinghamshire men of Sherwood Forest were renowned for their skill in archery (Note: As immortalised in the legends of Robin Hood.) and Nottingham and Derby were the only counties not on the Welsh Border that sent foot soldiers to all of King Edward I's Welsh Wars. They were often called out in the later Anglo-Scottish Wars, such as the Siege of Caerlaverock in 1300, the Weardale campaign of 1327, the Battle of Halidon Hill and Siege of Berwick in 1333, and the campaign of 1335. Nottingham levies were present at the Battle of Shrewsbury in 1403, and paid soldiers from the county were at the Battle of Agincourt (1415). The levies of Nottinghamshire under Sir John Markham fought against Lambert Simnel's rebels at the Battle of Stoke Field in 1487, and when the Pilgrimage of Grace revolt broke out in 1536, the Earl of Shrewsbury called them out to confront the rebels without waiting for the king's orders.

With invasion threatened in 1539 King Henry VIII held a Great Muster of all the counties, recording the number of armed men available in each hundred or wapentake. Nottinghamshire (Note: The town of Nottingham and two other wapentakes are apparently meant.) reported 284 men, of whom 21 bowmen and 10 billmen equipped with horses and 'harness' (armour) were ready to serve the king at all times. In addition the 'North Clyde' part of Bassetlaw Wapentake had 107 harness, 270 bowmen and 480 billmen, Broxtowe Wapentake had 154 harness, 300 billmen and 200 bowmen, and Rushcliffe Wapentake had 342 men.

== Nottinghamshire Trained Bands ==
The legal basis of the militia was updated by two acts of 1557 covering musters (4 & 5 Ph. & M. c. 3) and the maintenance of horses and armour (4 & 5 Ph. & M. c. 2). The county militia was now under the Lord Lieutenant, assisted by the deputy lieutenants and justices of the peace (JPs). The entry into force of these acts in 1558 is seen as the starting date for the organised county militia in England. Although the militia obligation was universal, it was impractical to train and equip every able-bodied man, so after 1572 the practice was to select a proportion of men for the Trained Bands (TBs), who were mustered for regular training.

The threat of invasion during the Spanish War led to an increase in training. The government initially emphasised the 17 'maritime' counties most vulnerable to attack, then a first group of 'inland' counties (including Nottinghamshire) whose TBs were organised from May 1585 onwards. In April 1588, as the threat from the Spanish Armada grew, Nottinghamshire reported 2800 able-bodied men available, and during the crisis that summer actually furnished 1,000 footmen, of whom 400 were trained, together with 100 pioneers, 20 lancers, 60 light horse and 20 'petronels' (the petronel was an early cavalry firearm).

In the 16th Century little distinction was made between the militia and the troops levied by the counties for overseas expeditions, and between 1585 and 1601 Nottinghamshire supplied 737 levies for service in Ireland and 150 for France. However, the counties usually conscripted the unemployed and criminals rather than the Trained Bandsmen – in 1585 the Privy Council had ordered the impressment of able-bodied unemployed men, and the Queen ordered 'none of her trayned-bands to be pressed'. Replacing the weapons issued to the levies from the militia armouries was a heavy cost on the counties. In 1596 and 1615 the corporation of Nottingham maintained its own militia of 16 trained men, and a further 24 bowmen and halberdiers were maintained at the expense of private individuals in the town.

With the passing of the threat of invasion, the trained bands declined in the early 17th century. Later, King Charles I attempted to reform them into a national force or 'Perfect Militia' answering to the king rather than local control. Before the First Bishops' War of 1639, Sir Jacob Astley was charged with organising and reviewing the TBs of a number of North Midland counties, including Nottinghamshire, ahead of a planned invasion of Scotland. He listed 407 men from the county out of an assessment of 1,050, the Privy Council 'sparing' the remainder for a 'Second Army' to be held in reserve. Of the 407, 282 were musketeers, and 125 'Corslets' (signifying pikemen); there were also 50 Cuirassiers and 10 Dragoons. The TBs were mustered in late November and December 1638, and the Midland contingents were used in an abortive amphibious attack on Eastern Scotland the following summer. For the Second Bishops' War of 1640 Nottinghamshire was ordered to raise 300 men and march them to Grimsby for shipment to Scotland. However, many of those sent on this unpopular service were untrained replacements and conscripts, and many officers were corrupt or inefficient.

=== Civil Wars ===
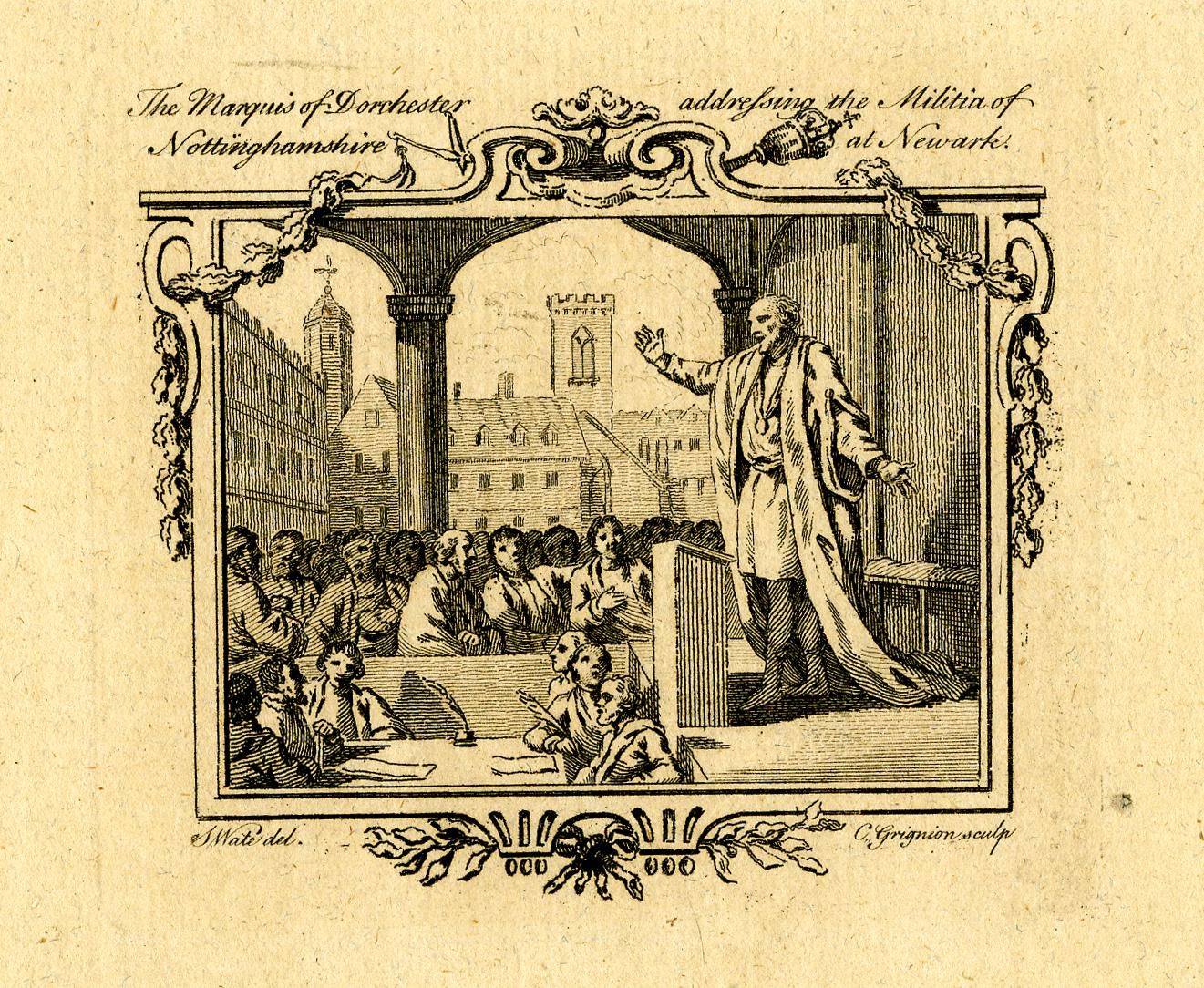
Henry Pierrepont, Viscount Newark, later 1st Marquess of Dorchester, addressing the Trained Bands of Nottinghamshire in July 1642, as depicted in 1771.

Control of the militia was one of the areas of dispute between Charles I and Parliament that led to the English Civil War. The king appointed Henry Pierrepont, Viscount Newark, as Lord Lieutenant of Nottinghamshire, and on 13 July 1642 at Newark-on-Trent he made an appeal to the trained bandsmen of the county to take up arms for the king, though few did so. In August Lord Newark and the High Sheriff of Nottinghamshire, Sir John Digby of Mansfield Woodhouse Manor, with a Troop of horse, tried to seize the TB armoury at Nottingham Castle, but were prevented by John Hutchinson until the rest of the king's army gathered. The King raised his standard at Nottingham on 22 August 1642, officially declaring war. From then on, both sides paid little attention to the part-time TBs, treating them as a source of arms and potential recruits for their permanent forces, or as town guards to supplement permanent garrisons. The Nottingham TB not having supported him, King Charles disbanded it in September and confiscated its weapons for his regulars.

After the Royalist army had left, Nottingham was secured by the Parliamentarians. Hutchinson was commissioned to raise the Nottingham TBs for Parliament and was later made governor of the town. Parliament nominated three local men to command the regiments as Colonels: Sir Francis Molyneux of Teversal, 2nd Baronet (who refused the commission), Sir Francis Thornhagh of Fenton, and Viscount Newark's younger brother Francis Pierrepont, who supported Parliament. Thornhagh appointed his son Francis Thornhagh as his Lieutenant-Colonel to command the TB foot regiment while he busied himself with raising a regiment of horse; Pierrepont appointed Hutchinson as his lt-col and eventual successor.

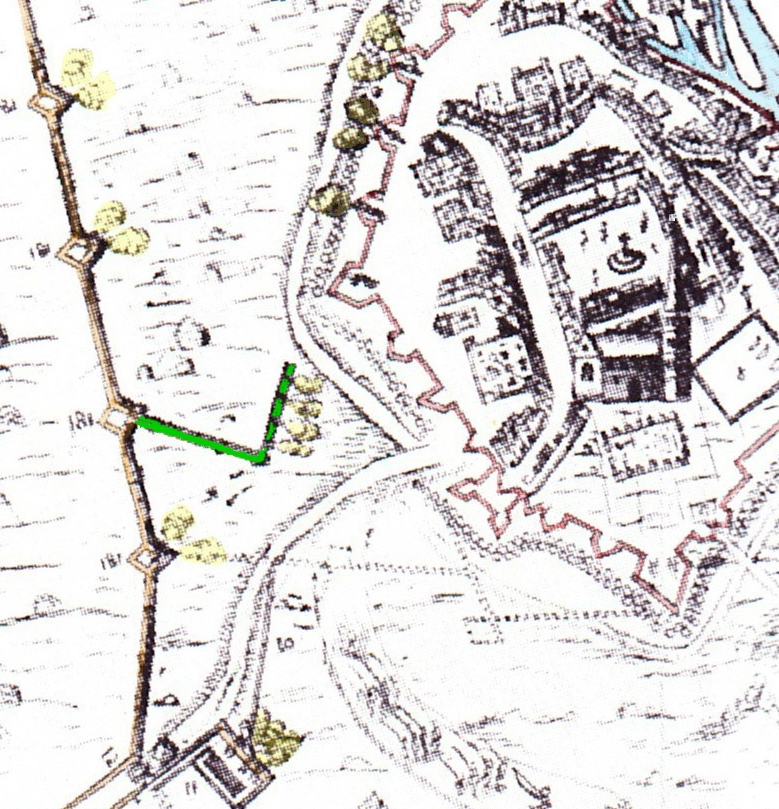
Map of the final Siege of Newark, 6 March 1645 to 8 May 1646.

Meanwhile, Newark declared for the king, the local TBs being raised for him by Sir John Digby, Sir Gervase Clifton, 1st Baronet, Robert Sutton of Averham, and a troop of horse under Sir John Byron of Newstead Abbey. (Digby's regiment was taken over by Col Anthony Gilby by the beginning of 1645.) The townspeople and TBs, with a few regular troops, fortified the town and withstood a succession of sieges from May 1643 under the command of Sir Robert Byron and later John, Lord Belasyse.

In September 1643 and January 1644 detachments from Newark almost succeeded in seizing Nottingham town and castle from its Parliamentarian garrison, and there was constant skirmishing between the two towns. After the first raid a detachment of the Royalist TBs retained a fort near the Trent Bridge. Colonel Hutchinson complained of Thornhagh's regiment that the men tended to slip away to their homes in Nottingham when they should have been on night guard and that on one occasion this allowed the 'Newarkers' to 'beat up their quarters' and capture 'almost two whole troops of the regiment'. He instituted a night watch of women to patrol the town in companies of 50 and give alarm of attack. Newark was one of the last Royalist garrisons to surrender after the end of the First Civil War in May 1646.

As Parliament tightened its grip on the country after winning the First Civil War it passed new Militia Acts in 1648 and 1650 that replaced lords lieutenant with county commissioners. Militia commissioners for Nottinghamshire and the town of Nottingham were appointed on 2 December 1648. The establishment of The Protectorate saw Oliver Cromwell take control of the militia as a paid force under politically selected officers to support his Rule by Major-Generals. From now on the term 'Trained Band' began to be replaced by 'Militia'.

== Nottinghamshire Militia ==
After the Restoration of the Monarchy, the English Militia was re-established by the Militia Act of 1661 under the control of the king's lords-lieutenant, the men to be selected by ballot. This was popularly seen as the 'Constitutional Force' to counterbalance a 'Standing Army' tainted by association with the New Model Army that had supported Cromwell's military dictatorship, and almost the whole burden of home defence and internal security was entrusted to the militia under politically reliable local landowners.

In 1697 the counties were required to submit detailed lists of their militia. Nottinghamshire had one foot regiment of 400 men in six companies under the command of the Lord-Lieutenant of Nottinghamshire, John Holles, 1st Duke of Newcastle as colonel, and two troops of horse each of 60 men.

The Militia passed into virtual abeyance during the long peace after the Treaty of Utrecht in 1713, and few units were called out during the Jacobite Risings of 1715 and 1745. However, the Duke of Kingston did raise a unit of volunteer cavalry in Nottinghamshire in 1745, the Duke of Kingston's Regiment of Light Horse or 'Royal Foresters', which saw action against the rebels.

== 1757 reforms ==
Under threat of French invasion during the Seven Years' War a series of Militia Acts from 1757 re-established county militia regiments, the men being conscripted by means of parish ballots (paid substitutes were permitted) to serve for three years. There was a property qualification for officers, who were commissioned by the lord lieutenant. An adjutant and drill sergeants were to be provided to each regiment from the Regular Army, and arms and accoutrements would be supplied when the county had secured 60 per cent of its quota of recruits.

Nottinghamshire was given a quota of 480 men to raise, but failed to do so, partly because the Lord Lieutenant, Thomas Pelham-Holles, 1st Duke of Newcastle, was opposed to the militia, and his Pelham family members were powerful in the county. There was also widespread anti-militia feeling in the county, with intimidation of parish constables, many of whose ballot lists were seized by rioters before they reached the lieutenancy meeting at Mansfield on 5 September 1757. A mob armed with clubs then invaded the meeting and destroyed the remaining lists. Many of the protesters in Nottinghamshire feared being forced into overseas service if they were selected by lot: some said that they would rather be hanged in England than scalped in America. There was also religious opposition to any form of census. Even when the riots were quelled and other counties' militia had been called out in the invasion crisis of 1759, the Nottinghamshire county gentry were apathetic, preferring to pay a large fine instead of raising their regiment.

=== American War of Independence ===
Nottinghamshire remained a defaulter county liable for militia fines throughout the 1760s. An attempt to raise the county regiment in 1765 failed because of a dispute over the town of Nottingham's quota. It was not until 1775, when war with the American colonies broke out, that agreement was reached in the county, and the balloting passed off without trouble. As Lord Lieutenant, Henry Pelham-Clinton, 2nd Duke of Newcastle, appointed Lord George Manners-Sutton, Member of Parliament (MP) for Grantham, as Colonel, his own son Henry Pelham-Clinton, Earl of Lincoln, MP for Nottinghamshire, as Lt-Colonel, and John Cartwright, a former naval officer, as Major. The men were organised into eight companies, including a Grenadier Company and a Light Company. The order to provide weapons to the regiment from the Tower of London was issued on 14 November 1775 and they arrived to be stored at Nottingham Castle about a month before the regiment was assembled for its first 28 days' training at Nottingham on 20 March 1776. Training was also carried out in 1777. With the threat of invasion from the Americans' allies, France and Spain, the militia was embodied for permanent duty on 31 March 1778. The regiment had been reduced to 320 men by the number of militiamen who had volunteered for the regular forces.

The Earl of Lincoln died on 22 October 1778, and the Duke of Newcastle appointed his youngest son, Lord John Pelham-Clinton, to succeed him. Major Cartwright was thereby passed over for the lieutenant-colonelcy, but while the regiment was stationed at Hull in late 1778, he was asked by Col Manners-Sutton to compile a book of regimental standing orders. This book was published and afterwards adopted by a number of other regiments. On the evening of 11 November 1778 a group of French warships entered the Humber, threatening Hull. The Nottinghamshire Militia beat to quarters and was posted to commanding points along the coast and reinforcing the town guard while the Invalids manned the town's guns. After approaching close to the batteries the French sheered away. While the regiment was stationed at Hull it practised musketry to good effect and gained the unofficial nickname 'Nottinghamshire Marksmen', which it used on recruiting advertisements for substitutes.

During the American War the army began linking its regiments of the line to particular counties as an aid to recruitment. The 45th Foot began sending recruiting parties into Nottinghamshire and gained the county name as its official subtitle in 1782. Although the county links were a dead letter for many regiments, the 45th gained a large proportion of its recruits during the following French wars from Nottinghamshire, and particularly from the Nottinghamshire Militia.

After being stationed at Hull for a year, the Nottinghamshire Militia marched to Southsea Common near Portsmouth, for summer camp. Leaving in two 'divisions' on 9 and 10 June 1779, it arrived on 28 June and remained in camp until going into winter quarters in Gosport in December. Here the duties included providing guards for the French prisoners of war confined in Forton Prison. In June 1780 the regiment was relieved at Gosport and went to camp on Ranmore Common in Surrey. This camp was broken up in bad weather in November, and the regiment was billeted with one division in Basingstoke and the other split between Farnham and Bagshot. It returned to Gosport from late January to March 1781, and was then moved to Poole in Dorset on anti-smuggling duty until May, when it camped at Stokes Bay, near Gosport, under the command of Maj Cartwright. Lieutenant-Col Lord John Pelham-Clinton died later in the year and was succeeded by Edward Thoroton Gould of Mansfield Woodhouse, who had been a junior officer in the 4th Foot at the first action of the American war at Concord, where he had been wounded and captured. After release he returned to England, married and sold his regular army commission in 1776. Again, Maj Cartwright was passed over for the promotion.

In the autumn of 1781 the regiment went into winter quarters, with detachments at Basingstoke, Andover, Hampshire, and nearby places. The following summer it was concentrated and camped on Brompton Common in Kent, where the principal duty was to mount guard over the stores and batteries of the Chatham Dockyard defences. Early in November 1782 it was ordered back to Nottinghamshire. Shortly after he had led the regiment in a march-past at Nottingham, Col Manners-Sutton died. The Hon Henry Willoughby, 23-year-old son of Lord Middleton, was appointed to the colonelcy. The Treaty of Paris having been agreed, the war ended and the militia returned to their headquarters to be disembodied, the Nottinghamshires completing this in March 1783.

The regiment's permanent staff were housed in Nottingham and the arms, uniforms and equipment were stored in the castle. The ballot was employed to keep the disembodied regiment up to strength. From 1784 to 1792 the militia were supposed to assemble for 28 days' annual training, even though to save money only two-thirds of the men were actually called out each year. In 1786 the number of permanent non-commissioned officers (NCOs) was reduced.

Colonel Willoughby rarely served with the regiment and resigned in 1790; Edward Thoroton Gould was appointed colonel in his place, with Thomas Charlton of Chilwell as lt-col. Major Cartwright was continually passed over for promotion, even though he claimed to have been the effective commander of the regiment for much of the American war. He was a Radical Whig – he supported both the American and French revolutionaries, incorporating the 'cap of liberty' in the regimental badge he designed (he saw the militia as the constitutional force and a safeguard against tyranny). He was also a campaigner for parliamentary reform, which embarrassed the government. It is clear that the intention was to induce him to resign, but he would not do so. The regimental officers supported him, demanding assurances that promotion would be by seniority, and that no officer would be removed without there being a court of enquiry. He was finally removed on 23 October 1791 after he had celebrated the Storming of the Bastille, the method used being a misapplication of a requirement in the Militia Act that a proportion of officers should retire every five years.

=== French Revolutionary War ===
The militia had already been called out before Revolutionary France declared war on Britain on 1 February 1793. The Nottinghamshire Militia assembled for permanent duty on 28 January. About a month later it received orders to proceed to the Lincolnshire coast, and marched out of Nottingham on 6 March, never again being quartered in the county town. In Lincolnshire it was based at Boston, with outlying detachments at Spalding and elsewhere.

The French Revolutionary Wars saw a new phase for the English militia: they were embodied for a whole generation, and became regiments of full-time professional soldiers (though restricted to service in the British Isles), which the Regular Army increasingly saw as a prime source of recruits. They served in coast defences, manned garrisons, guarded prisoners of war, and were used for internal security, while their traditional local defence duties were taken over by the Volunteers and mounted Yeomanry.

In the summer of 1794 the Nottinghamshires were sent to join a militia camp at Danbury, Essex. This camp was broken up at the end of October. The regiment then wintered in 13 separate detachments in and around Braintree and Bocking, Essex. The quarters of the regiment were so dispersed that it received permission to give the men cash to buy food locally rather than attempt to supply them through a central contractor. The regiment then moved to Ely, with a detachment at Newmarket. By June 1795 the regiment was part of a large encampment at Warley, Essex, under the command of Lt-Gen Cornwallis. In early 1796 it moved to King's Lynn in Norfolk. By now the regiment had two rifle companies (which paraded on either flank of the line) and two light 'battalion guns'. A number of militiamen were taught gun drill by a party from the Royal Artillery. About now the regiment gained its second nickname of 'Saucy Notts', which it kept for many years. From King's Lynn the regiment was sent to York, and then into garrison at Hull.

Early in 1797 there was an invasion scare, and the Yorkshire coast was deemed a possible target for a Franco-Dutch landing. The Nottinghamshires were relieved at Hull and were posted in detachments along the coast around Bridlington. The whole coast was carefully reconnoitred, a black-out enforced, and the troops practised in rapidly turning out on alarm. However, the

By May they were back in Hull, in new barracks, and were part of a large brigade in the area. The grenadier and light infantry companies of each regiment in the brigade were grouped into composite battalions, of which Lt-Col Carlton commanded the Light Battalion. The Royal Navy's victory at the Battle of Camperdown in October 1797 ended the threat to North East England. On 1 May 1798 the regiment marched out of Hull and camped at Dimlington on the coast near Spurn Point.

=== Supplementary Militia ===
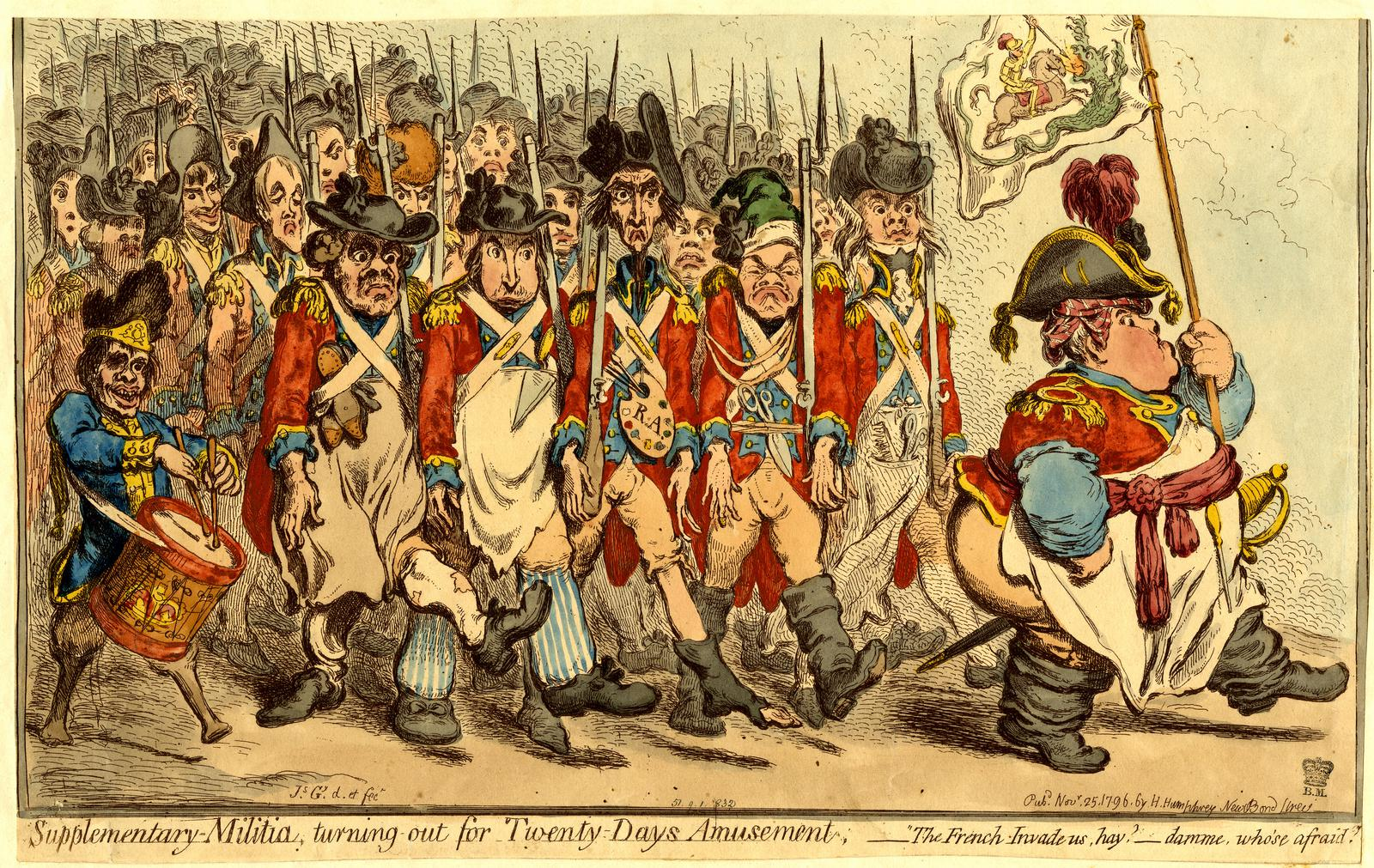
Supplementary-Militia, turning-out for Twenty Days Amusement: 1796 caricature by James Gillray.

In an attempt to have as many men as possible under arms for home defence in order to release regulars, the Government created the Supplementary Militia in 1796, a compulsory levy of men to be trained in their spare time, and to be incorporated in the Militia in emergency. Nottinghamshire's additional quota was fixed at 896 men. The lieutenancies were required to carry out 20 days' initial training as soon as possible. There was still opposition to the ballot in Nottinghamshire: in 1796 a radically inclined Friendly society held a meeting to consider either opposition to or infiltration of the new force. There were rumours of a 'Pistol Club', and some loyal citizens were terrorised by shots fired into their houses. Nevertheless, Nottinghamshire fulfilled its quota and the men were trained in the Hundreds from which they were recruited. In March 1798 half the Nottinghamshire Supplementaries were called out and sent into Northern England. However, the force was disbanded in 1799, the discharged men being encouraged to volunteer for the regular army.

=== Scotland ===
For the winter of 1798–99 the Nottinghamshire Militia marched via York to winter quarters in Edinburgh. In June 1799 it exchanged stations with the North Yorkshire Militia at Glasgow. The following month a recruitment drive for the regular army encouraged about 300 men from the Nottinghamshire Militia to accept the offered bounty and transfer to various regiments of the line. At the end of the year a company's worth (over 100 men) volunteered for the 35th Foot and four officers received regular commissions in that regiment, while a further 60 men volunteered for other regiments. In March 1800 the regiment marched from Glasgow to Dumfries, and from there moved in August 1801 to Kelso. With the war apparently ending, it was ordered to return to the Nottinghamshire area in March 1802, detachments being quartered at Doncaster (initially, then to Retford and Southwell) and at Retford and Newark. With the signing of the Treaty of Amiens the war ended and in late April 1802 the detachments concentrated at Newark to be disembodied, the other ranks (ORs) being paid off with a month's pay as a gratuity.

=== Napoleonic Wars ===
However, the Peace of Amiens was short-lived and Britain declared war on France once more on 18 May 1803. The Nottinghamshire Militia was immediately embodied and the main body sent to Dover, later to Margate and then Ramsgate, while the rifle companies were stationed on the Isle of Wight. In June 1804 it moved to Canterbury and then in November to Ridding Street Barracks near Tenterden before taking up winter quarters in the barracks at Rye and Winchelsea. Once again, the regiment supplied its quota of volunteers for the regulars.

During the invasion crisis of 1805, while Napoleon assembled the 'Army of England' across the English Channel at Boulogne, the Nottinghamshire Militia were stationed in the Southern District (Sussex), the most vulnerable sector. Together with the East and West Norfolks, the Nottinghamshires formed a brigade under Maj Gen Alexander Mackenzie Fraser, defending Dungeness. It also took part in a royal review at Brighton that summer. On 1 September the Nottinghamshires had 633 men in 10 companies under Lt Col John Need at Rye and Pleydon Barracks, sharing with five companies of the East Norfolks. It spent the winter in barracks at nearby Steyning.

In May 1807 the regiment marched from Steyning to Portsmouth. An increase in pay for the regulars (but not the militia) encouraged another 225 men to transfer in 1807, including one whole company, with its officers. Many of these volunteers served with the 45th Foot in the battles of the Peninsular War. However, the militiamen who stayed with the regiment were awarded extra pay for labouring on the defences of Portsmouth. During the summer they were camped on Southsea Common. In February 1808 the Nottinghamshire Militia marched from Portsmouth to Lewes in Sussex, then in June moved to Bletchingdon Barracks near Brighton. That summer the whole regiment volunteered to serve in the Peninsular war; the offer was politely turned down, but individual militiamen were encouraged to continue volunteering for active service. The 45th Foot had recently formed a 600-strong 2nd Battalion, the greater part comprising former Nottinghamshire militiamen. The Nottinghamshire Militia wintered at Lewes from September 1808 to February 1809 and then spent the spring at Rye, Winchelsea and Pleydon before returning to Lewes and then Bletchingdon. At the end of the year it moved to Salisbury, then in May 1810 to Frankfort Barracks, Plymouth, where the duties included guarding the large number of prisoners of war in Millbay Prison. In October the regiment was moved to the same duty at Dartmoor Prison, where it foiled an attempted breakout during a violent storm. It returned to Frankfort Barracks in November.

=== Nottinghamshire Local Militia ===
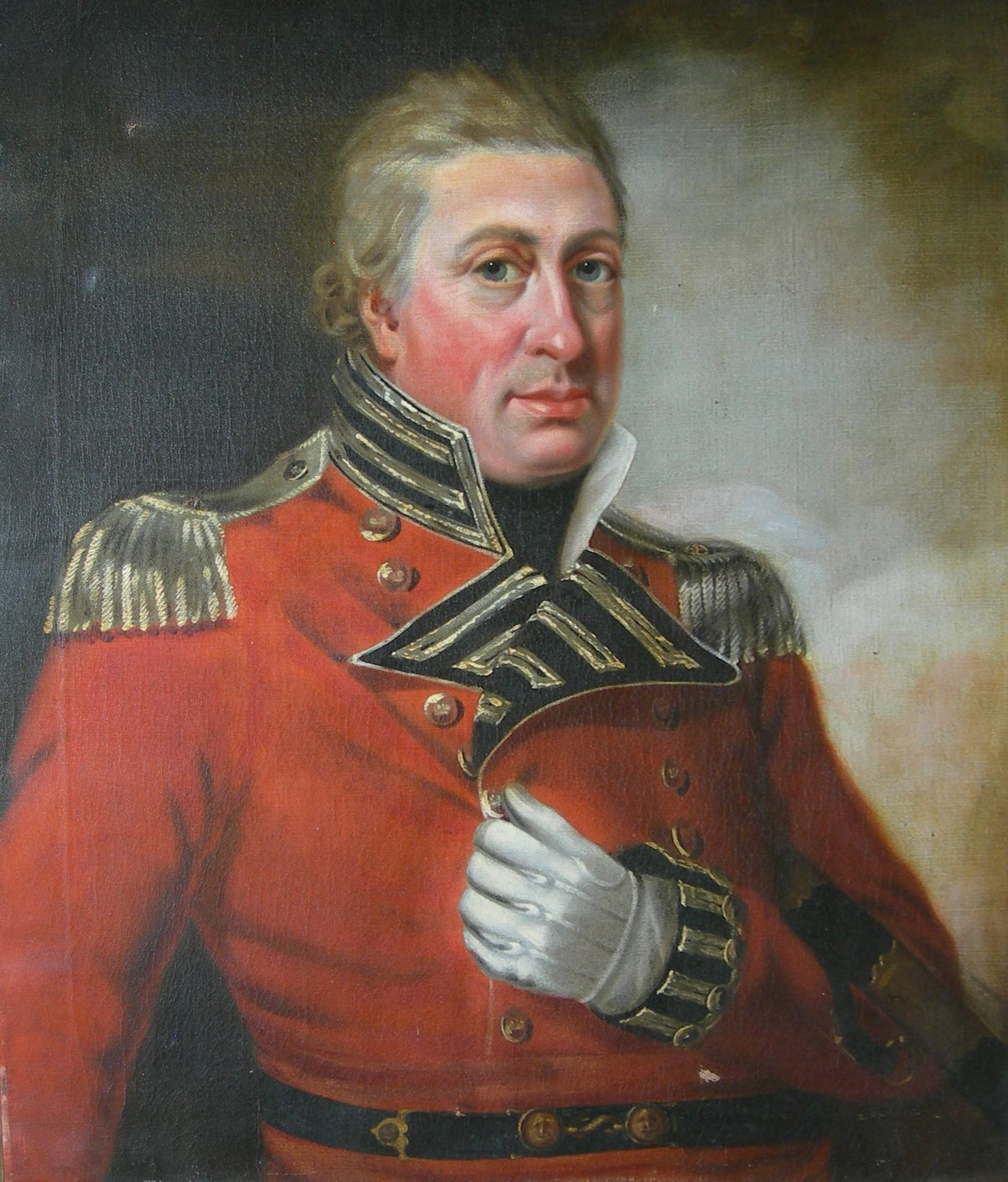
Portrait of Sir Thomas White in his Nottinghamshire Local Militia uniform

While the Regular Militia were the mainstay of national defence during the Napoleonic Wars, they were supplemented from 1808 by the Local Militia, which were part-time and only to be used within their own districts. These were raised to counter the declining numbers of Volunteers, and if their ranks could not be filled voluntarily the militia ballot was employed. The various units of Nottinghamshire Volunteers were disbanded and incorporated into four regiments of Local Militia:

- 1st (Nottingham) Regiment – Col Ichabod Wright of Mapperley Hall (formerly of the Nottingham Cavalry)
- 2nd (Southwell) Regiment – Lt-Col Commandant William Sherbrooke (formerly of the Nottingham Rangers)
- 3rd (Retford) Regiment – Lt-Col Cmdt Sir Thomas White, 1st Baronet (also of the Sherwood Rangers Yeomanry); his son the future 2nd Baronet served as a junior officer in this regiment from 1813
- 4th (Newark) Regiment – Lt-Col Cmdt Thomas Thoroton (formerly of the Newark Loyal Volunteers)

When their regiments were not under training, the permanent staffs of the local militia were employed as recruiting parties for their county's regular militia. The Local Militia were disbanded in 1816.

=== Ireland and Royal duty ===
While the Nottinghamshire Militia was stationed at Plymouth in July 1811, the government invited militia regiments to volunteer to serve in Ireland. All but 14 men out of about 900 did so, and the regiment was selected as one of the first group to do a tour of duty there. It appears that the government was happy to send the Nottinghamshires (and other Midlands militia regiments) to Ireland in case they developed sympathies with the Luddites, who had begun their machine-breaking in Nottingham.

On 26 August the regiment under the command of Col Gould embarked at Plymouth on board the transports Margaret, Nestor, Wadstay and Fame, which sailed for Dublin, where it was housed at Palatine Square Barracks. Unlike the other militia regiments of the first group, which were scattered across Ireland, the Nottinghamshires were kept in the Irish capital throughout their tour of duty there. Men continued to volunteer for the regulars, many of them being shipped to the Peninsula still wearing their militia uniforms. The regiment returned to England in 1812, landing at Bristol on 1 August and marching to Colchester. At the beginning of October the Nottinghamshire Militia left Colchester and marched to the Tower of London, with detachments at Kew, Epsom and Guildford. The Tower detachment provided guards for St James's Palace, Bank of England and other places usually protected by the Foot Guards. With the numbers of men who had transferred to the regulars and the detachments, the regiment was short of men and had to arm the bandsmen, who guarded the Tower gates in their white uniforms. The title of Royal Sherwood Foresters was conferred on the regiment by the Prince Regent on 16 December 1813 as a reward for having done duty at the Tower and Palace.

After duty at the Tower, the Royal Sherwood Foresters wintered at Deal and Margate in Kent, supplying a guard of honour for the Prince Regent and King Louis XVIII when the latter sailed from Dover in April 1814 to assume the throne of France following Napoleon's abdication. Soon afterwards the regiment marched to Norman Cross Prison in Huntingdonshire, where large numbers of French prisoners of war were being released. The regiment was then ordered to be disembodied, marching to Newark to complete the process on 5 August 1814. The Royal Sherwood Foresters were not re-embodied during the short Waterloo campaign.

=== Long peace ===
After Waterloo there was another long peace. Although officers continued to be commissioned into the militia and ballots were still held, the regiments were rarely assembled for training. The permanent staff of the Royal Sherwood Foresters were charged with guarding the regimental stores in Newark Town Hall. This became an important duty towards the end of 1816, when it was feared that the Luddites would attempt to seize the arms. Night sentries were posted and the staff issued with live ammunition. One of the permanent staff was the poet Robert Millhouse, who had enlisted as a private in 1811. His poems attracted the attention of Maj John Gilbert-Cooper-Gardiner, who promoted him to corporal and placed him on the permanent staff in 1817.

Colonel Gould resigned his commission in 1819, and Lt-Col Henry Coape was promoted to succeed him in command. In 1820 the regiment carried out its first training since 1814, then again in 1821, 1825 and 1831, but not thereafter, the ballot was suspended by the Militia Act 1829, and the permanent staff of NCOs and drummers was reduced. The Lord Lieutenant continued to commission officers in the regiment, Lt-Col Gilbert-Cooper-Gardiner succeeding Col Coape on his resignation in 1825, and after his death in 1833 Lancelot Rolleston, MP for South Nottinghamshire, was appointed to the colonelcy.

== 1852 reforms ==
The Militia of the United Kingdom was revived by the Militia Act 1852, enacted during a renewed period of international tension. As before, units were raised and administered on a county basis, and filled by voluntary enlistment (although conscription by means of the Militia Ballot might be used if the counties failed to meet their quotas). Training was for 56 days on enlistment, then for 21–28 days per year, during which the men received full army pay. Under the Act, Militia units could be embodied by Royal Proclamation for full-time home defence service in three circumstances:

1. 'Whenever a state of war exists between Her Majesty and any foreign power'.
2. 'In all cases of invasion or upon imminent danger thereof'.
3. 'In all cases of rebellion or insurrection'.

The Royal Sherwood Foresters was reformed at Newark in 1852, still under the command of Col Rolleston, but with a number of new officers, including William Leigh Mellish, appointed Lt-Col, and several who had seen service in the regular army. The regimental stores moved from Newark Town Hall into rooms beneath the new Corn Exchange. The reformed regiment carried out its first training in November 1852 with 600 men, but had reached its full establishment of 1223 ORs by voluntary enlistment in time for the second training in May 1853.

=== Crimean War and Indian Mutiny ===
War having broken out with Russia in 1854 and an expeditionary force sent to the Crimea, the militia were called out for home defence. The Royal Sherwood Foresters was embodied at Newark on 1 December 1854. As in previous wars, volunteering from the militia for the regular army was encouraged.

The regiment stayed at Newark until 20 August when it entrained for Aldershot Camp. Over 26–7 December the regiment went by rail to Liverpool where it embarked for Ireland on the Niagara. It was quartered at Athlone for several months. The war was ended by the Treaty of Paris signed at the end of March 1856, and the militia could be stood down. The Royal Sherwood Foresters left Athlone for Dublin on 21 May and then embarked at Kingstown on the Cleopatra for Liverpool on 23 May. It proceeded at once to Newark, where it remained until orders for disembodiment arrived. This was completed with a parade on 1 July, which the townspeople of Newark treated as a public holiday.

In January 1857 a new regimental store was completed at Newark, and the arms, clothing and accoutrements were moved there from the Corn Exchange. The Royal Sherwood Foresters had not been mustered for their annual training when they were called out again for garrison duty when much of the army was sent to quell the Indian Mutiny. The regiment was embodied on 1 October 1857, and went by train to the new South Camp barracks at Aldershot on 1 December, leaving a depot company at Newark. Having been issued with 1842 pattern percussion cap smoothbore muskets when reformed in 1852, the regiment was now equipped with the 1853 pattern Enfield Rifled Musket. In February 1858 the regiment moved by train to Newcastle upon Tyne, with a detachment at Tynemouth. In April a serious riot broke out amongst the English and Irish coalminers at Shotley Bridge in County Durham, and Lt-Col Mellish led a strong detachment of the Royal Sherwood Foresters to aid the civil power. They found that the contending bodies rioters had armed themselves with firearms and even small cannon, but the appearance of the militia immediately quelled the disturbance. As a precaution one company remained at Shotley Bridge for several days.

In September the regiment (now consisting of 12 companies including the grenadier and light companies), moved to Glasgow, with a detachment at Ayr. During the year the regiment won the British Army shooting competition, berating every other regular or embodied militia regiment in the country. The regiment was afterwards asked to provide instructors for other militia units and to the staff of the School of Musketry at Hythe, Kent. The regiment returned to England and was disembodied on 30 March 1859 and was disembodied on 30 March 1859.

The regiment returned to a routine of annual training at Newark from 1860. Since 1852 no new militia colonels had been appointed, and after the death of Col Rolleston in 1862 Lt-Col Mellish became commanding officer. The Militia Reserve introduced in 1867 consisted of present and former militiamen who undertook to serve overseas in case of war.

== Cardwell and Childers reforms ==
Under the 'Localisation of the Forces scheme introduced by the Cardwell Reforms, Regular infantry battalions were linked together and assigned to particular counties or localities, while the county Militia and Volunteers were affiliated to them in a 'sub-district' with a shared depot. Sub-District No 27 (Counties of Nottingham and Leicester) comprised:

- 1st & 2nd Battalions, 17th (Leicestershire) Regiment of Foot
- 45th (Sherwood Foresters) Regiment of Foot (Note: In 1866 the 45th (Nottinghamshire) Regiment of Foot took the additional subtitle of 'Sherwood Foresters')
- Leicestershire Militia at Leicester
- Royal Sherwood Foresters Militia at Nottingham
- 1st Administrative Battalion, Leicestershire Rifle Volunteer Corps at Leicester
- 1st Administrative Battalion, Nottinghamshire Rifle Volunteer Corps at East Retford
- 1st (Robin Hood) Nottinghamshire Rifle Volunteer Corps at Nottingham

Militia battalions now came under the War Office rather than their lords lieutenant. They had a large cadre of permanent staff (about 30) and a number of the officers were former Regulars. Around a third of the recruits and many young officers went on to join the Regular Army.

Following the Cardwell Reforms a mobilisation scheme began to appear in the Army List from December 1875. This assigned Regular and Militia units to places in an order of battle of corps, divisions and brigades for the 'Active Army', even though these formations were entirely theoretical, with no staff or services assigned. The Royal Sherwood Foresters were assigned to 2nd Brigade of 2nd Division, VII Corps. The brigade would have mustered at Northampton in time of war.

=== 4th Battalion, Sherwood Foresters ===
The 1881 Childers Reforms took Cardwell's scheme a stage further, the linked regular regiments combining into single two-battalion regiments. However, the 17th Foot already had two battalions and remained at Leicester; the Nottinghamshire units were instead amalgamated with the 95th (Derbyshire) Regiment of Foot and its associated units to form the Sherwood Foresters (Derbyshire Regiment):

- 1st Battalion (ex-45th Foot)
- 2nd Battalion (ex-95th Foot)
- 3rd (2nd Derbyshire Militia) Battalion (Chatsworth Rifles))
- 4th (Royal Sherwood Foresters Militia) Battalion at Newark
- 5th (1st Derbyshire Militia) Battalion – merged into 3rd Bn 1891
- 45th Regimental Depot at Derby
- 1st & 2nd Derbyshire Volunteer Battalions
- 1st & 2nd Nottinghamshire Volunteer Battalions

=== Second Boer War ===
With the bulk of the Regular Army serving in South Africa during the Second Boer War, the Militia were called out. The 4th Bn Sherwood Foresters was embodied on 11 December 1899 It then volunteered for overseas service and embarked for South Africa with a strength of 32 officers and 657 ORs under the command of Col Napier Pearse. On arrival at Port Elizabeth on 31 January, the Left Half battalion was stationed at Cradock Siding with detachments at Rosmead, Kroom Hoogte, Henning and Steynsburg, the Right Half at Port Elizabeth with detachments guarding the Barkley and Swartzkop bridges. On 22 May the battalion arrived at Zand River, then moved on up the railway to put Roiodevar Station into a state of defence before reaching the Rhenoster River on 6 June. Seven companies of the battalion and some Colonial scouts camped at the newly repaired railway bridge with two of the companies forming an outpost line, while the other company and a company of the Railway Pioneer Regiment (about 150 men in total) guarded a large consignment of stores left by the railway at Roodewal, 3 miles (4.8 km) away. At daybreak next morning General Christiaan De Wet launched a simultaneous attack at three points on the railway. The main force of Boers, between 3000 and 4000 strong with heavy guns, surrounded and attacked the Rhenoster River Bridge camp. After about 4 hours' resistance, the position became untenable and the battalion surrendered. De Wet himself had attacked Roodewal with a small force, but made little headway against the garrison entrenched behind the railway embankment and piles of stores until he was reinforced by the main body and guns after the surrender at the bridge. Having secured both positions the Boers looted or burned the stores, destroyed the bridge again, and tore up several miles of railway track, cutting off the main British army at Pretoria for several days. The force camped at the bridge had some 36 men killed and 104 wounded. During the whole action 4th Bn had lost 2 officers, the sergeant-major and 26 ORs killed and a further 2 officers and 62 ORs wounded.

Having few facilities for prisoners of war, the Boers separated their prisoners on 26 June, sending the officers to Bethlehem and Fouriesburg then releasing the ORs across the border into Natal on 5 July. They were sent to Ladysmith to be re-armed and re-clothed, and then to Pretoria. The officers were released by the arrival of Lt-Gen Archibald Hunter's troops on 26 July and were then employed guarding Boer prisoners after Gen Marthinus Prinsloo's surrender on 29 July. The officers rejoined their men at Pretoria on 17 August. The reformed battalion was initiually deployed on a range of hills outside Pretoria and then on 6 September moved back to Port Elizabeth. It was stationed there until 4 April 1901, with detachments at Cradock and Aberdeen. Aberdeen was attacked on 5 March, but the Boers were driven off.

The battalion returned to the UK, where it was disembodied on 10 May 1901, having suffered total losses of 4 officers and 42 ORs killed or died of disease during the campaign. The battalion was awarded the Battle honour South Africa 1900–01 and the participants received the Queen's South Africa Medal with clasps for 'Cape Colony', 'Orange Free State', 'Transvaal' and 'South Africa 1901'.

In 1903 the parent regiment changed its title to 'Sherwood Foresters (Nottinghamshire and Derbyshire Regiment)', which better described its composition and recruiting area.

== Special Reserve ==
After the Boer War, the future of the militia was called into question. There were moves to reform the Auxiliary Forces (Militia, Yeomanry and Volunteers) to take their place in the six Army Corps proposed by the Secretary of State for War, St John Brodrick. However, little of Brodrick's scheme was carried out. Under the more sweeping Haldane Reforms of 1908, the Militia was replaced by the Special Reserve (SR), a semi-professional force whose role was to provide reinforcement drafts for regular units serving overseas in wartime, rather like the earlier Militia Reserve. The battalion became the 4th (Extra Reserve) Battalion, Sherwood Foresters, on 14 June 1908 (the Derbyshire battalion became the 3rd (Reserve) Bn).

=== Mobilisation ===
When World War I broke out the 4th (ER) Bn was embodied on 4 August 1914 under the command of Lt-Col A.S. Hamilton. It went to its war station at Sunderland, where it was joined by the 3rd (R) Bn in May 1915. The two battalions remained there for the rest of the war in the Tyne Garrison. There they carried out their twin roles of forming part of the East Coast defences and preparing Army Reservists, Special Reservists, and later new recruits as reinforcement drafts for the Regular battalions serving on the Western Front.

=== 14th (Reserve) Battalion, Sherwood Foresters ===
After Lord Kitchener issued his call for volunteers in August 1914, the battalions of the 1st, 2nd and 3rd New Armies ('K1', 'K2' and 'K3' of 'Kitchener's Army') were quickly formed at the regimental depots. The SR battalions also swelled with new recruits and were soon well above their establishment strength. On 8 October 1914 each SR battalion was ordered to use the surplus to form a service battalion of the 4th New Army ('K4'). Accordingly, the 4th (Extra Reserve) Bn formed the 14th (Service) Bn, Sherwood Foresters at Lichfield in October. It became part of 91st Brigade in 30th Division. In April 1915 the War Office decided to convert the K4 battalions into 2nd Reserve units, providing drafts for the K1–K3 battalions in the same way that the SR was doing for the Regular battalions. 91st Brigade became 3rd Reserve Brigade and the battalion became 14th (Reserve) Battalion, training drafts for the 9th, 10th, 11th and 12th (Service) Bns of the regiment. By March 1916 it was at Brocton Camp on Cannock Chase. On 1 September 1916 the 2nd Reserve battalions were transferred to the Training Reserve (TR) and the battalion was redesignated 13th Training Reserve Bn, still in 3rd Reserve Bde. The training staff retained their Sherwood Foresters badges. The battalion specialised as a 'Young Soldier' unit carrying out basic training, and on 27 October 1917 it returned to the Sherwood Foresters as 53rd (Young Soldier) Bn. By now it was at Rugeley in Staffordshire as part of 1st Reserve Brigade, moving in about October 1918 to Clipstone Camp in Nottinghamshire. It continued training reinforcements until the end of the war.

On 8 February 1919 53rd (YS) Bn and the 51st and 52nd training battalions of the Foresters were converted into service battalions and in March went to Germany where they formed 3rd Midland Infantry Brigade in Midland Division (the former 6th Division) of the British Army of the Rhine. The units left in July 1919 and 53rd (S) Bn was disbanded at Kilworth on 19 April 1919

=== Postwar ===
The disembodied SR resumed its old title of Militia in 1921 but like most militia units the 4th Sherwood Foresters remained in abeyance after World War I. By the outbreak of World War II in 1939, the only officer still listed for the regiment was the Honorary Colonel, the Duke of Portland, appointed 50 years before. The Militia was formally disbanded in April 1953.

== Commanders ==
=== Colonels ===
The following served as Colonel of the Regiment:

- John Holles, 1st Duke of Newcastle, 1697
- Col Lord George Manners-Sutton, appointed 19 August 1775, died 5 January 1783
- Col The Hon Henry Willoughby, appointed 1783, resigned 1790
- Col Edward Thoroton Gould, promoted 30 June 1790, resigned 1819
- Col Henry Coape, promoted 1819, resigned 1825
- Col John Gilbert-Cooper-Gardiner, promoted 1825, died 13 February 1833
- Col Lancelot Rolleston, appointed 11 April 1833, died 18 May 1862

Following the 1852 reforms the militia rank of colonel was abolished and in the future the lieutenant-colonel would become the commanding officer (CO); at the same time, the position of Honorary Colonel was introduced.

=== Lieutenant-colonels ===
Lieutenant-Colonels of the regiment (commanding officers after 1862) included the following:

- Lt-Col Henry Pelham-Clinton, Earl of Lincoln, appointed 1775, died 18 October 1778
- Lt-Col Lord John Pelham-Clinton, appointed 22 October 1778, died 1781
- Lt-Col Edward Thoroton Gould, appointed 1781, promoted 30 June 1790
- Lt-Col Thomas Charlton, appointed 1791, resigned 1808
- Lt-Col John Need, appointed 3 August 1803
- Lt-Col Henry Coape, promoted from major 1808, promoted to colonel 1819
- Lt-Col John Gilbert-Cooper-Gardiner, promoted from major 1819, promoted to colonel 1825
- Lt-Col Roger Pockington, promoted from major 1825, resigned 1833
- Lt-Col Sir Thomas Wollaston White, 2nd Baronet, appointed 1 June 1833 (also lt-col of the Sherwood Rangers Yeomanry from 29 April 1840)
- Lt-Col William Leigh Mellish, promoted 9 November 1852, succeeded to command 1862, died 1864
- Lt-Col Alexander Boddam-Whetham, promoted April 1864, retired March 1871
- Lt-Col Arthur Swann Howard Lowe, promoted 23 March 1871
- Lt-Col E.R.S. Richardson (retired Regular Army), appointed 2 May 1886
- Lt-Col J.W. Keyworth, promoted 7 July 1894
- Lt-Col Napier L. Pearse (retired Sherwood Foresters major) promoted 8 November 1899
- Lt-Col George A. Wilkinson, DSO
- Lt-Col Reginald Brittan, DSO, (retired Regular Army captain), appointed 3 September 1807
- Lt-Col A.S. Hamilton (retired Regular Army major), appointed 1 January 1914

=== Honorary colonels ===
The following served as Honorary Colonel of the regiment:

- Col Alexander Boddam-Whetham, former CO, appointed 23 March 1871, died 29 March 1872
- William Cavendish-Bentinck, 6th Duke of Portland, KG, GCVO, appointed 8 June 1889, reappointed to SR battalion 14 June 1908

== Heritage and ceremonial ==
=== Uniforms and insignia ===
When the regiment was reformed in 1775 the uniform was a red coat with black facings and white lining, with white waistcoat and breeches, worn with black gaiters. Major Cartwright designed the regimental badge, with a 'cap of liberty' resting on a clasped book, an arm with drawn sword behind, the motto Pro legibus et libertate above, all surrounded by a garter inscribed 'Nottinghamshire Regiment'. The first Regimental colours issued in 1775 carried the coats of arms of the Duke of Newcastle and the County of Nottinghamshire on the regimental or 'county' colour. The rifle companies of 1796 were clothed in green. The four regiments of Nottinghamshire Local Militia wore similar uniforms to the regular Nottinghamshire Militia.

When the 'Royal Sherwood Foresters' title was granted in 1813, the facings changed to blue, appropriate to a Royal regiment. At the same time the regiment adopted a new badge with the coat of arms of the borough of Nottingham (a ragged cross and three ducal coronets) surrounded by a garter bearing the new title, with an imperial crown above and surrounded by two branches of oak, surmounted with the motto Loyalté. This badge was retained until 1881. The officers' shoulder-belt plate about 1810 had the Royal cypher within a garter inscribed 'Notts Militia'; after 1813 there was a crown above the cypher and the new title was on a scroll beneath.

The coatee and tunic buttons of 1840–81 had the arms of Nottingham with a crown above and a scroll with the title beneath. The Forage cap badge when the regiment was reformed in 1852 was the numeral '59' but this was soon replaced by the 1813 badge. The officers' Shako plate of 1861–9, the men's Forage cap badge of 1874–81 and the helmet badge of 1878–81 had the arms of Nottingham and oak wreath.

When the regiment joined the Sherwood Foresters in 1881, it adopted that regiment's badges and the white facings assigned to English county regiments. The Sherwood Foresters regained their traditional Lincoln green facings in 1913.

=== Precedence ===
During the War of American Independence the counties were given an order of precedence determined by ballot each year. For the Nottinghamshire Militia the positions were:

- 42nd on 1 June 1778
- 2nd on12 May 1779
- 13th on 6 May 1780
- 9th on 28 April 1781
- 5th on 7 May 1782

The militia order of precedence balloted for in 1793 (Nottinghamshire was 15th) remained in force throughout the French Revolutionary War. Another ballot for precedence took place at the start of the Napoleonic War, when Nottinghamshire was 71st. This order continued until 1833. In that year the King drew the lots for individual regiments and the resulting list remained in force with minor amendments until the end of the militia. The regiments raised before the peace of 1763 took the first 47 places, those between 1763 and 1783 took the next 22: the Royal Sherwood Foresters were 59th. Most regiments paid little notice to the number, but the Royal Sherwood Foresters did briefly wear it as a cap badge in 1852.

=== Battle honour ===
The regiment bore the single battle honour South Africa 1900–01, awarded for its service in the Second Boer War. This was rescinded in 1910 when the Special Reserve battalions assumed the same honours as their parent regiments.

== See also ==
- Trained Bands
- Militia (English)
- Militia (Great Britain)
- Militia (United Kingdom)
- Special Reserve
- Sherwood Foresters
