= Listed buildings in Letwell =

Letwell is a civil parish in the Metropolitan Borough of Rotherham, South Yorkshire, England. The parish contains 17 listed buildings that are recorded in the National Heritage List for England. Of these, three are listed at Grade II*, the middle of the three grades, and the others are at Grade II, the lowest grade. The parish contains the village of Letwell and the surrounding countryside. Apart from Langold Farmhouse and associated structures, all the listed buildings are arranged along the main street of the village, and consist of houses and cottages, a farmhouse and farm buildings, a church, a meeting room, a dovecote, and a telephone kiosk.

== Key ==
Grade	Criteria
II*	Particularly important buildings of more than special interest
II	Buildings of national importance and special interest

== Buildings ==
Name and location	Photograph	Date	Notes	Grade
St Peter's Church; 53.37738°N 1.16052°W		15th century	The oldest parts of the church are the tower and the north wall, the rest being rebuilt in 1820, and again in 1867–69 following a fire. The church is built in limestone with slate roofs, and consists of a nave and a chancel in one unit, the chancel with an apse, and a north vestry, a south porch, and a west tower. The tower is in Perpendicular style, and has three stages, diagonal buttresses, a three-light west window, two-light bell openings, an embattled parapet with a north gargoyle and crocketed corner pinnacles, and a tiled pyramidal roof. The porch has an entrance with a pointed arch, a hood mould, and a crow-stepped gable.	II*
4 Barker Hades Road; 53.37701°N 1.15415°W	—	16th to 17th century	Cottages later combined into one house, it has a timber framed core, it was encased in limestone in the 18th century with later alterations, and it has a pantile roof, hipped on the right. There are two storeys, a range of three bays, and a projecting gabled cross-wing on the left. On the front is a doorway with a pantile canopy, and the windows are casements.	II
Langold Farmhouse; 53.37257°N 1.14420°W	—	Mid 18th century	The house is in Palladian style, in limestone, with a sill band, and a Westmorland slate roof. There are two storeys, an attic and basement, a front of three bays, and two bays on the sides. The middle bay projects under a pediment, and contains a Venetian window with an entablature to the side lights, and a keystone. Above is a Diocletian window, and an oeil-de-boeuf with keystones in the tympanum. Each outer bay has a tall round-headed window with a moulded impost and a keystone under a half-pediment. At the rear is a Serlian doorway.	II*
Garden wall northeast of Langold Farmhouse; 53.37306°N 1.14398°W	—	Mid 18th century (probable)	The wall encloses a polygonal-shaped garden, it is in limestone with some brick lining, and has stone copings. The south wall has buttresses, and contains two square-headed doorways. The north wall has a quoined panel and a doorway. In the right return is a basket-arched doorway with quoins and a keystone.	II
South Farmhouse; 53.37671°N 1.15560°W	—	Mid 18th century (probable)	The farmhouse, which was extended in the 19th century, is in limestone on a chamfered plinth, with quoins and a hipped pantile roof. There are three storeys, a main range of four bays and a projecting two-storey wing. In the angle is a porch and a doorway that has a fanlight with a flattened ogee head. Above the doorway is a single-light window, the other windows in the main range are mullioned with two lights, and in the wing are large 20th-century casement windows.	II
The Old Rectory; 53.37687°N 1.15472°W	—	Mid 18th century	The former rectory is in limestone, with a sill band, and a twin pantile roof, hipped on the right. There are three storeys, a front of three bays, and two bays on the sides. On the garden front is a French window, a two-storey canted bay window, and a single-storey bay window. The other windows are mullioned casements.	II
Stable and coach house, Langold Farm; 53.37198°N 1.14231°W	—	c. 1760	The stable block and coach house are in limestone, with a Westmorland slate roof, and two storeys. They form a U-shaped plan open to the south. The main east range has five bays, the outer bays projecting slightly. In the central bay is a pedimented portico with rusticated quoins and a continuous impost band to a tall round arch with a keystone. At its rear is a Diocletian window in the tympanum of the portico. The rear range has nine bays.	II*
7 and 9 Barker Hades Road; 53.37707°N 1.15534°W	—	Mid to late 18th century	A pair of houses in limestone on a plinth with a pantile roof that has a coped gable and shaped kneelers on the right. There are two stympanum of teh portico.reys, four bays, and a continuous rear outshut. In the centre is a doorway with a chamfered surround and a cambered lintel. The windows in the ground floor are four-light casements, and in the upper floor they are two-light horizontally-sliding sashes.	II
Dovecote; 53.37598°N 1.15569°W		Late 18th century (probable)	The free-standing dovecote is in red brick on a stone plinth, with a string course, a dentilled eaves course, and a hipped tile roof with lead ridges, and a louvred glover with a weathervane. There are two storeys and an octagonal plan. In the ground floor is a doorway with a keystone, and the upper floor contains round-arched recesses, some with pigeon holes. Inside is a central post with a revolving ladder, and tiers of nesting holes with segmental heads.	II
Post Office; 53.37679°N 1.15661°W		Late 18th century (probable)	A row of three cottages, one used as a post office, the left part on a plinth, in limestone, with quoins and a pantile roof. There are two storeys and seven bays. On the front are three doorways, and most of the windows are two-light mullioned casements.	II
Walnut Cottage; 53.37685°N 1.15492°W	—	Late 18th century	Two cottages combined into one house, it is in limestone with quoins, and a pantile roof with coped gables and shaped kneelers. There are two storeys and five bays. There are two doorways, one with a segmental-arched head. The windows are casements, some horizontally sliding, and some with arched heads, and there is a gabled dormer window.	II
North Farmhouse; 53.37691°N 1.15673°W		Late 18th to early 19th century	The farmhouse is in limestone with stone slate eaves courses, and a pantile roof with coped gables and shaped kneelers. There are two storeys, a front range of three bays, a rear wing on the left, and a parallel rear range infilling the angle. The middle bay has a pediment with a lunette in the tympanum. In the centre of the house is a doorway with a fanlight, flanked by sash windows with lintels grooved as voussoirs. Elsewhere, the windows have single lights, or are mullioned.	II
Farm building to east of North Farmhouse; 53.37714°N 1.15641°W	—	Late 18th to early 19th century	A combination farm building in limestone, with quoins, a pantile roof, and an L-shaped plan. It consists of a two-storey barn incorporating a three-storey dovecote, and a single-storey wing to the right. The barn has an infilled basket-arched wagon entrance and slit vents, and the dovecote has an opening with a ledge, and a hipped roof. The wing contains an open-fronted three-bay shed, casement windows, and garage doors.	II
Farm building, cartshed and forge, North Farm; 53.37749°N 1.15685°W	—	Early 19th century	A combination farm building forming the north side of the farmyard, it is in limestone with a hipped pantile roof. There is a single storey, and the range consists of a six-bay north-facing cartshed, a central cowshed, and a three-bay south-facing shelter shed with a forge at the end. The forge has a door and a window with cambered arches, and the shelter shed has tapered stone columns.	II
Farm building to rear of North Farmhouse; 53.37710°N 1.15686°W	—	Early 19th century	The farm building is in limestone with a pantile roof, two storeys, and an L-shaped plan, with single-storey extensions. The openings include basket-arched wagon entries, casement windows, hatches, and slit vents. At the rear of the main range is a horse engine house with a hipped roof, and there are external stone steps.	II
Church Rooms; 53.37672°N 1.15596°W		1870	The meeting hall is in limestone, with quoins, a pantile roof, a gabled one-bay front, and four bays along the sides. On the front is a doorway with a double-chamfered surround and a cornice, and a two-light mullioned casement window to the right, above which is a slit opening, and a datestone. On the left side are three three-light transomed casement windows.	II
Telephone kiosk 53.37678°N 1.15696°W		1935	A K6 type telephone kiosk, designed by Giles Gilbert Scott. Constructed in cast iron with a square plan and a dome, it has three unperforated crowns in the top panels.	II
