= William Mellish (cricketer) =

English soldier, landowner, and cricketer

William Leigh Mellish (11 June 1813 – 18 April 1864) was an English soldier, landowner and cricketer who played first-class cricket for Cambridge University in 1832. He was born in East Tuddenham, Norfolk and died at Hodsock Priory, near Worksop, Nottinghamshire.

Mellish was the elder son of the Rev. Edward Mellish, rector of East Tuddenham and later Dean of Hereford and his wife, who was Elizabeth Jane Leigh. George Mellish, a noted mid-Victorian barrister and judge, was his younger brother. He was educated at Eton College and at Trinity College, Cambridge. While at Cambridge University, he appeared in two first-class cricket matches for the university side, both of them against the Cambridge Town Club; in one, he opened the batting, in the other he played as a tail-end batsman.

Mellish left Cambridge without taking a degree; in 1833 he joined the British Army as a Second lieutenant in the Rifle Brigade. He reached the rank of Captain in that regiment, but sold his commission in 1846 and left the full-time army. When the Militia was reformed in 1852 he was appointed Lieutenant-Colonel of Nottinghamshire's regiment, the Royal Sherwood Foresters Militia. He was in command of the regiment when it was embodied for home defence duties during the Crimean War and Indian Mutiny, and led a detachment in aid of the civil power to suppress a serious riot by armed coalminers at Shotley Bridge in 1858. He assumed formal command of the regiment when the last Colonel died in 1862, and continued until his death.

In 1843 he married Margaret Anne, second daughter of Sir Samuel Cunard, 1st Baronet, and they had several children. In 1855, he inherited Hodsock Priory, which had been held by the Mellish family since the 17th century, from his cousin Anne Chambers, née Mellish. Upon his death, his son Henry Mellish inherited Hodsock Priory. He was buried in the parish church of Blyth, Nottinghamshire.
