= Braithwaite baronets of Poston (1802) =

Escutcheon of the Braithwaite baronets of Poston

The Braithwaite baronetcy, of Poston in the County of Hereford, was created in the Baronetage of the United Kingdom on 18 December 1802 for Major-General John Braithwaite. The title became extinct on the death of the second Baronet in 1809.

== Braithwaite baronets, of Poston (1802) ==
- Sir John Braithwaite, 1st Baronet (1739–1803)
- Sir George Charles Braithwaite, 2nd Baronet (1762–1809)

== Notes ==
Baronetage of the United Kingdom
Preceded by Dickson baronets	Braithwaite baronets of Poston; 18 December 1802	Succeeded by White baronets
