= Letwell =

Village and civil parish in South Yorkshire, England

Coordinates: 53°22′40″N 1°09′00″W

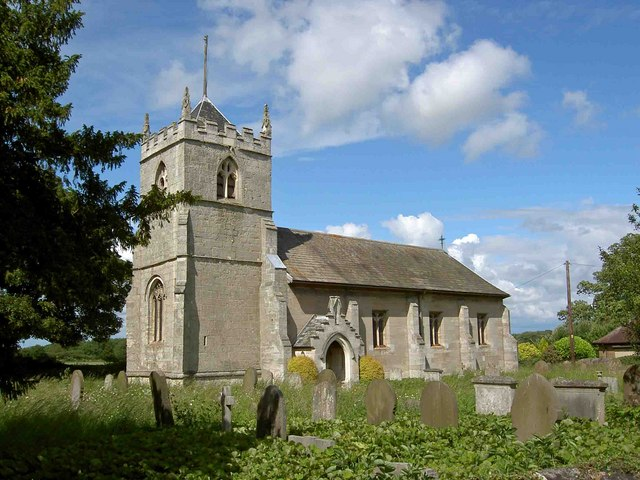
St Peter's church

Letwell is a rural village and civil parish in the Metropolitan Borough of Rotherham in South Yorkshire, England, on the border with Nottinghamshire. It lies between Dinnington and Langold, off the B6463 road. It sits at an elevation of around 75 metres above sea level. It had a population of 111. At the 2011 Census the population had fallen to less than 100. Population details are now included in the civil parish of Gildingwells.

The name Letwell derives from the Middle English lettewell meaning 'obstructed spring'.

The first reference to Letwell was in the 12th century when it was part of the lands of Tickhill Castle.

Listed buildings include St Peter's church with its 15th-century tower, an octagonal red-brick 18th century dovecote, and another late 18th century dovecote. A number of Georgian buildings in Letwell are also listed, including farm cottages, the rectory, and the village hall.

The village of Firbeck lies to the north of Letwell, while Gildingwells lies to the south.

== See also ==
- Listed buildings in Letwell
