= Henry Mellish =

Henry Mellish FRGS, CB (31 October 1856 – 2 February 1927) was known for his participation in competitive rifle shooting and meteorology. He inherited the Hodsock Priory estate in 1864 upon the death of his father William Leigh Mellish.

He was educated at Eton and at Balliol College, Oxford.

Mellish was called in 1882 to the Bar at the Inner Temple. Instead of practising law, he had a career in Nottinghamshire County government and served as a magistrate. He attained the rank of lieutenant-colonel of the Nottinghamshire Volunteers and Territorial Force.

In competitive rifle shooting he represented England in the Elcho Shield in over twenty occasions at Wimbledon and Bisley.

Mellish was President of the Royal Meteorological Society in 1909–1911 and maintained a weather recording station at Hodsock Priory for many years.

Henry Mellish School and Specialist Sports College was named in his honour.
