= Albert Road drill hall =

- Retford
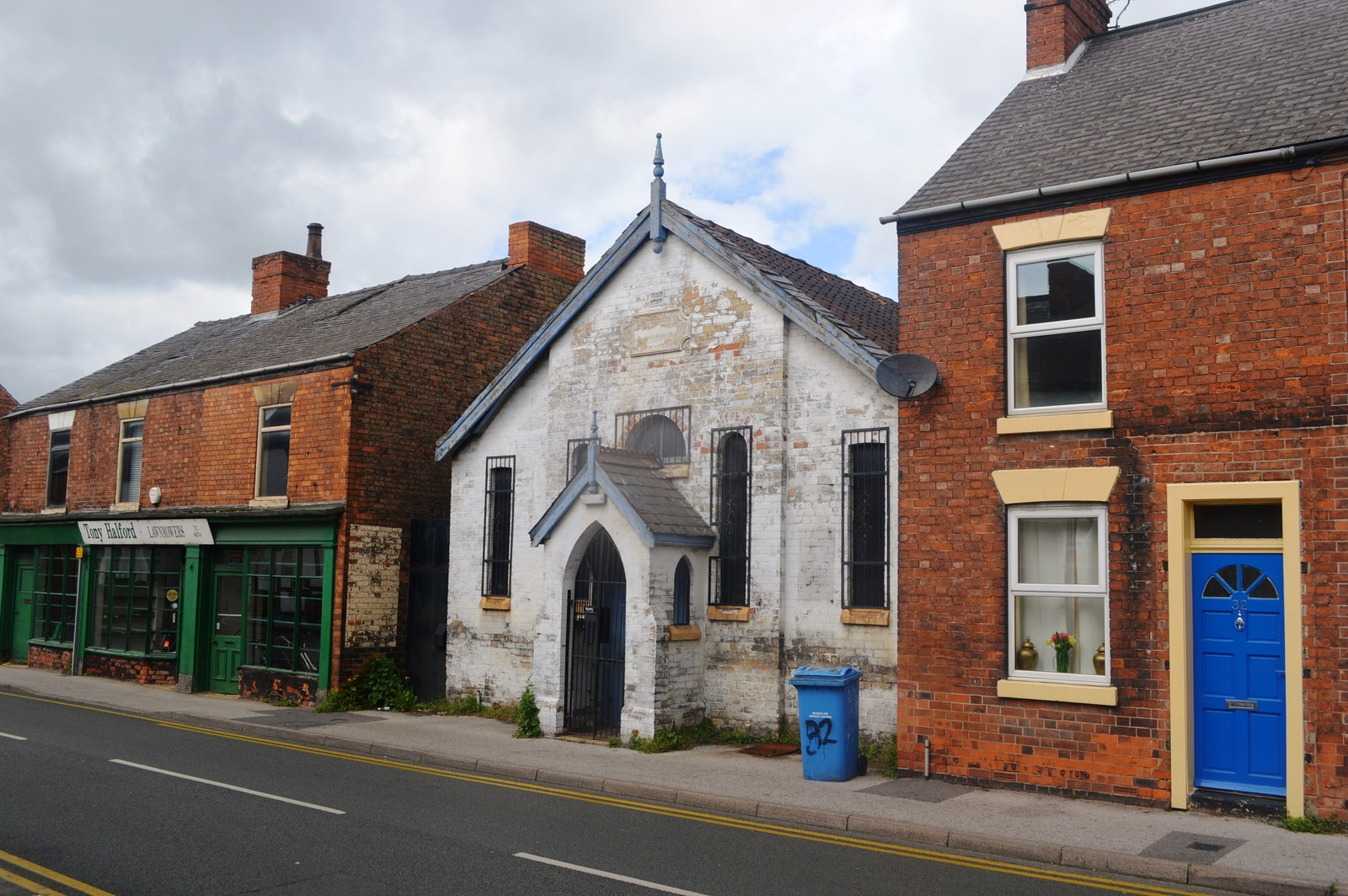
- The "Albert Hall"

Site information
- Type: Drill hall

Location
- Location within Nottinghamshire
- Coordinates: 53.31867°N 0.94173°W

Site history
- Built: 1860
- In use: 1860-Present

The Albert Road drill hall is a former military installation in Retford.

== History ==
The building was designed as a mission hall for All Hallows' Church, Ordsall and was completed around 1860. After an extension to St Alban's Church, Ordsall was completed in 1913, the parish had sufficient capacity and regarded the hall as surplus to requirements. Instead it became the headquarters of the Sherwood Rangers Yeomanry in 1914. The regiment was mobilised at the drill hall in August 1914 before being deployed to Gallipoli. After a modern Territorial Army Centre was established in Hallcroft Road, the hall was decommissioned and was used as a Methodist Sunday School Centre and then as a storage facility.
