= Sir Thomas White, 5th Baronet =

British baronet

Sir Thomas Astley Woollaston White, 5th Baronet, of Tuxford and Wallingwells (13 May 1904 – 16 May 1996), was the son of Sir Archibald White, 4th Baronet.

== Family ==
Escutcheon of the White baronets of Tuxford and Wallingwells (1802)

Sir Thomas married Daphne Margaret Athill on 8 July 1935. The couple spent their honeymoon at Barrogill Castle, which was bought in 1952 by Queen Elizabeth The Queen Mother, and renamed the Castle of Mey.

Sir Thomas and his family lived on the Torhousemuir Estate, near Wigtown in Dumfries and Galloway. His father bought the estate in 1944 from Lord John FitzRoy.

Sir Thomas succeeded his father as 5th Baronet of Tuxford and Wallingwells upon Sir Archibald's death on 16 December 1945. Daphne, from thence, became known as Lady White.

== Death and succession ==
Sir Thomas died on 16 May 1996 after suffering health problems for some time. The title passed on to his nephew, Sir Nicholas White, 6th Baronet, the son of Sir Thomas's late brother Captain Richard Taylor White, R.N. DSO**, who had died the previous year.

Lady White died on 20 December 2012 (the 210th anniversary of the creation of the baronetcy), aged 99.

Baronetage of the United Kingdom
Preceded by Archibald White	Baronet of Tuxford and Wallingwells; 1945–1996	Succeeded by Nicholas White
