= Listed buildings in Gildingwells =

Gildingwells is a civil parish in the Metropolitan Borough of Rotherham, South Yorkshire, England. The parish contains six listed buildings that are recorded in the National Heritage List for England. All the listed buildings are designated at Grade II, the lowest of the three grades, which is applied to "buildings of national importance and special interest". The parish contains the village of Gildingwells and the surrounding countryside, and all the listed buildings are farmhouses or farm buildings.

== Buildings ==
Name and location	Photograph	Date	Notes
Barn, Sunny Bank Farm; 53.36077°N 1.16350°W	—	Early 17th century (probable)	The barn is in sandstone with quoins and a pantile roof. There is a single storey, four bays, and a lean-to outshut. The barn contains flat-headed cart entrances, slit vents, and other openings.
Burrs Farmhouse and outbuilding 53.36645°N 1.16507°W	—	Early 17th century (probable)	The outbuilding was added probably in the 18th century, and the buildings are in sandstone with pantile roofs. The house has a chamfered plinth, quoins, two storeys and an attic, three bays, a hipped roof, an extension on the rear left and an addition in the angle. The doorway has a fanlight, most of the windows are casements, and in the left return is a two-light mullioned attic window with a hood mould. The outbuilding contains doorways and windows, and there are external stone steps.
36 Woodsetts Road; 53.35996°N 1.16357°W	—	18th century (probable)	A sandstone house with a pantile roof, two storeys, three bays, and a partial outshut at the rear on the left. On the front is a porch with a hipped roof, and a doorway with a rusticated surround and a cornice. The windows are sashes with rusticated surrounds.
Barn and stable, Pear Tree Farm; 53.36491°N 1.16472°W	—	18th century (probable)	The barn and stable are in sandstone, with quoins, stone slate eaves courses, and a pantile roof with coped gables and shaped kneelers. There are two storeys and four bays. The openings include doorways, casement windows, slit vents, and upper floor hatches. At the rear are stone steps leading to an upper floor doorway.
Cartshed, Burrs Farm; 53.36626°N 1.16479°W	—	Mid to late 18th century	The cartshed is in stone with a pantile roof, and has one storey and a loft. On the front are two round-arched openings, partly infilled in brick, with a central pier, imposts and keystones. In the gable is an oculus with a keystone, also bricked up.
Home Farmhouse; 53.35949°N 1.16321°W	—	c. 1800	The house is roughcast, with a sill band, and a hipped tile roof. There are three storeys, three bays, and a two-storey one-bay extension on the left. In the centre is a porch and a doorway, to the left is a bay window, the other windows in the lower two floors are sashes, and in the top floor they are casements.
