= Gildingwells =

Village and civil parish in South Yorkshire, England

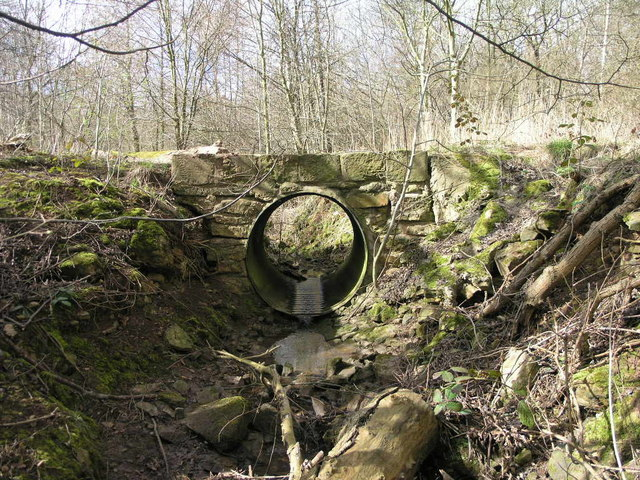
County Bridge

Gildingwells is a village and civil parish in the Metropolitan Borough of Rotherham in South Yorkshire, England, on the border with Nottinghamshire. It lies between Dinnington and Carlton in Lindrick at 53°22′N 1°10′W, and at an elevation of around 60 metres above sea level. It has a population of 115, increasing to 226 at the 2011 Census but now including Letwell.

Situated on a rural crossroads, Gildingwells is little more than a collection of farms. Education and shopping needs are fulfilled by the nearby settlements of Dinnington and Woodsetts.

The name Gildingwells probably derives from the Old English gildandewellas meaning 'the gushing springs'. Alternatively, the first element could be derived from gylden meaning 'golden'.

== See also ==
- Listed buildings in Gildingwells
