= Sir Thomas White, 2nd Baronet =

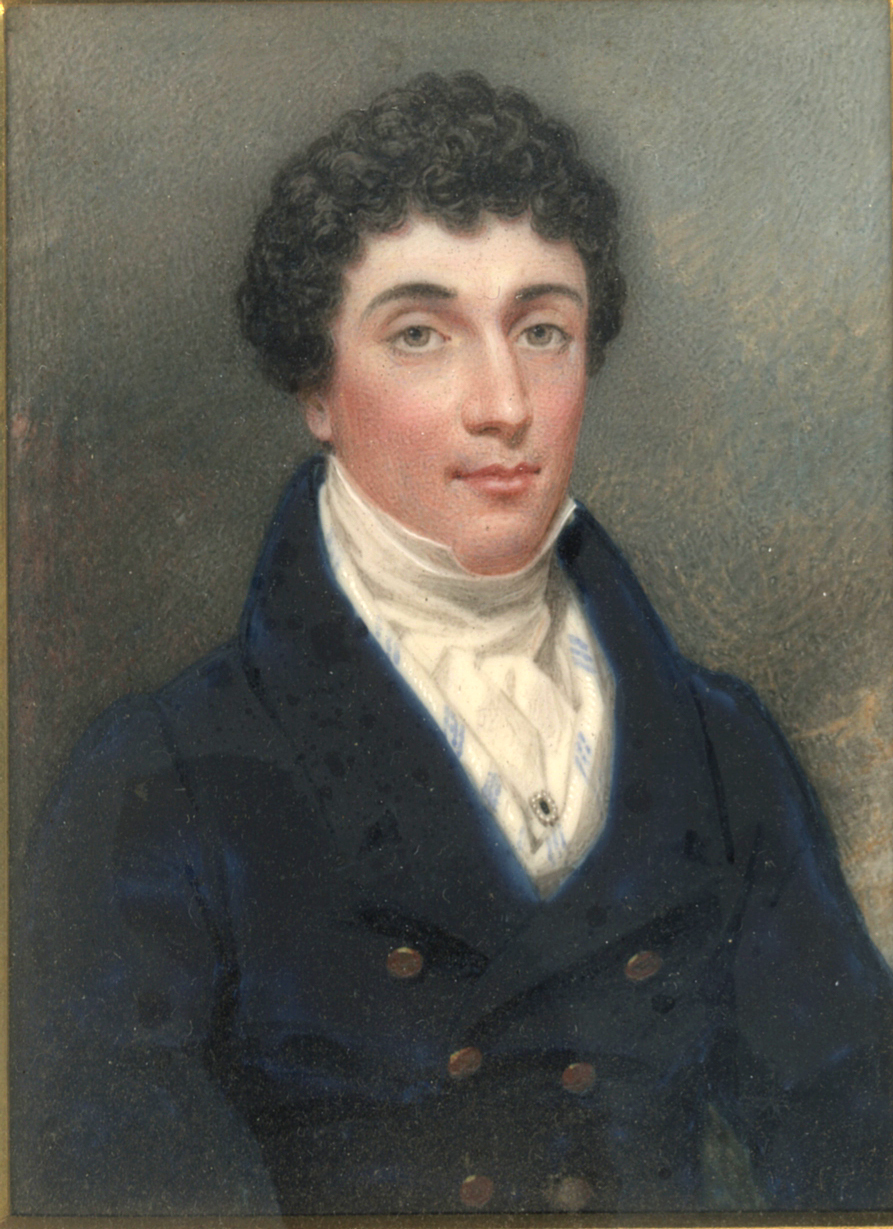
Sir Thomas White, 2nd Baronet, as a young man.

Sir Thomas Woollaston White, 2nd Baronet, of Tuxford and Wallingwells (3 October 1801 – 7 August 1882), was 16 years old when he succeeded his father Sir Thomas White, 1st Baronet, in his titles and estates. Being a minor when he succeeded, he was cared for by two guardians, Sir Frederick Gustavus Fowke, Bt., of Lowesby Hall in the County of Leicestershire, and his cousin Henry Gally Knight of Langold. Gally Knight was a well-known archaeologist and the author of Ecclesiastical Architecture of Italy and Normandy, amongst others.

White attended Rugby School in Warwickshire, before joining the 16th Lancers.

== Marriage and family ==
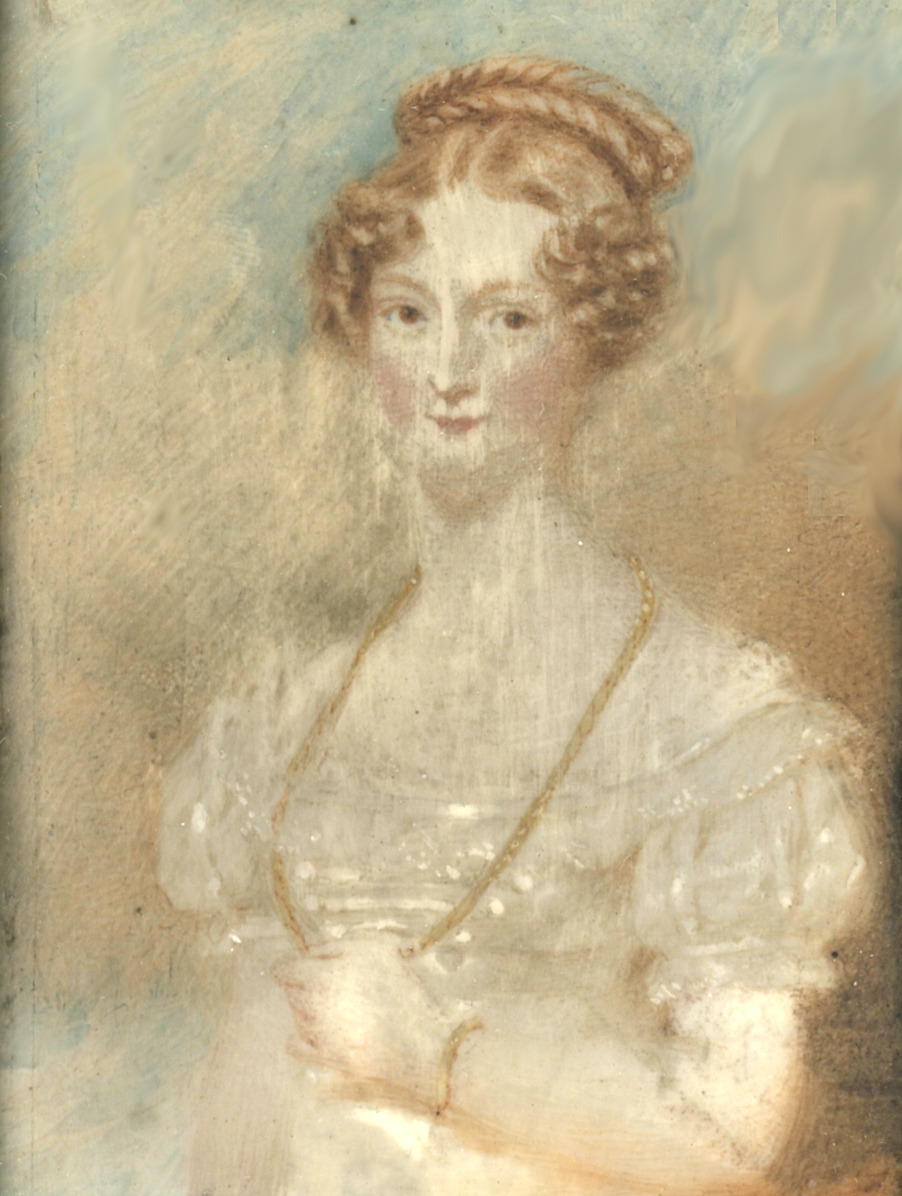
Georgina, Lady White, was the first wife of Sir Thomas White, Bt. She died at the age of 18

On 4 March 1824, White married Georgina Ramsay, the youngest daughter of George Ramsay, Esq., of Barnton and Sauchie. She died on 2 December 1825, aged 18, and was buried in the White family vault at the Church of St Nicholas, Tuxford.

White married, secondly, on 21 March 1827, Mary Euphemia Ramsay, daughter of William Ramsay, Esq., of Gogar. Mary was a cousin of Georgina's, their fathers being first cousins, both descending from the 4th Lord Belhaven and Stenton and their mothers being sisters.

=== Children from White's first marriage ===
	Name	Born	Died
1.	Georgina, married Lieutenant-Colonel the Honourable Horace Manners Monckton, son of 5th Viscount Galway)		1879

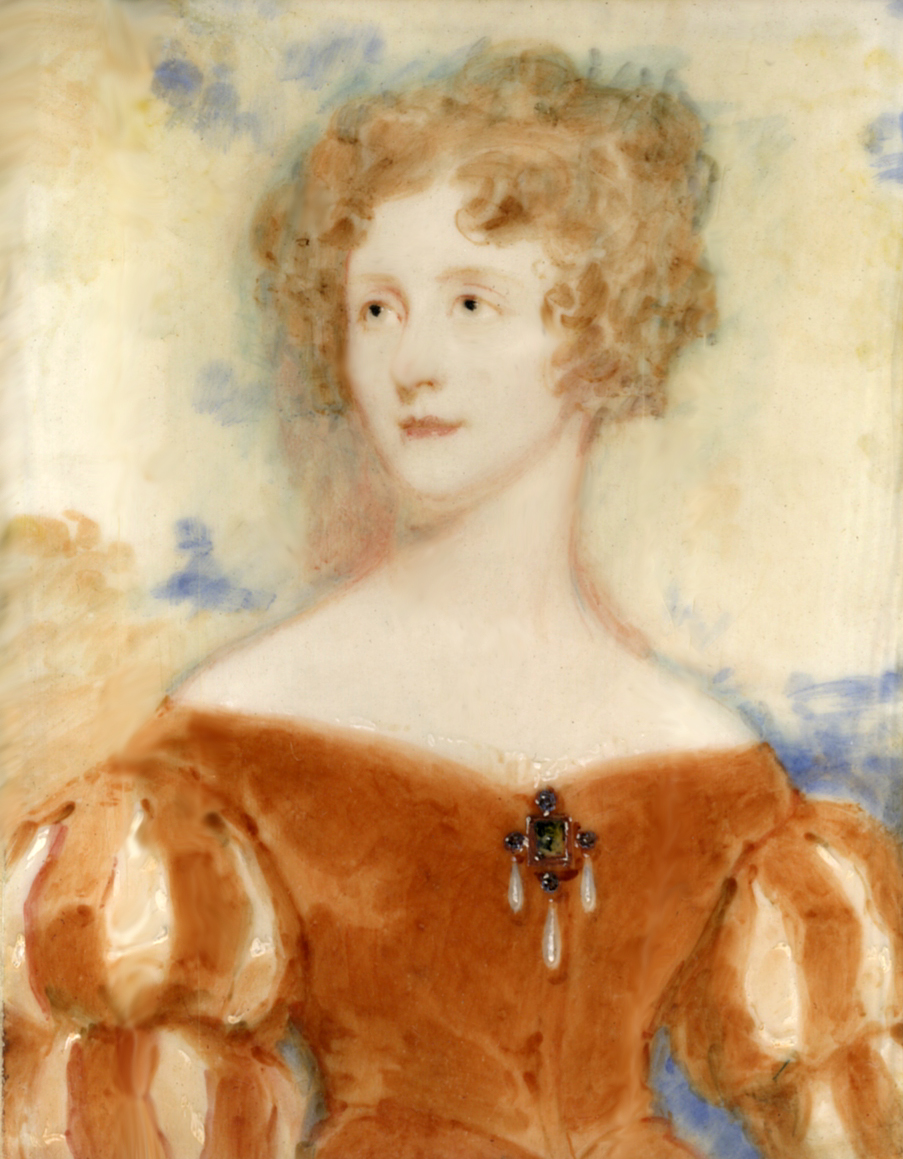
Mary Euphemia, Lady White, was the second wife of Sir Thomas, 2nd Bt., and mother of the 3rd Baronet.

=== Children from White's second marriage ===
	Name	Born	Died
1.	Thomas Woollaston, his heir	7 February 1828	20 May 1907
2.	Mary Elizabeth	16 July 1829	15 September 1894
3.	Bethia	22 November 1830	31 January 1834
4.	Frances (Fanny) Lucy Fowke	31 May 1832	17 March 1896
5.	William Knight Hamilton	23 January 1834	11 June 1900

== Army career ==
White's first military commission was as an Ensign in the 3rd (Retford) Regiment, Nottinghamshire Local Militia, commanded by his father. Having served with the 16th Lancers after leaving school, the Regiment was due to depart for India on campaign. However, due to his age, his guardians refused to allow him to go with his regiment and arranged for a transfer to the 3rd Light Dragoons.

When White was in the 3rd Light Dragoons, the Duke of York, who was at that time the Commander-in-Chief, came to inspect the regiment at Brighton, while it was on its Sunday church parade. Instead of, as is usual, walking behind the line of officers and inspecting the men, the Duke walked in front of the officers and stopped when opposite White. "Your name," he said, "is Sir Thomas Woollaston White?" He acknowledged that this was correct. "Your father raised, armed, and clothed a regiment of volunteers at his own expense?" White replied that this was the case and his Royal Highness answered, "A very noble deed, a very noble deed. Attend my levee, Sir."

However, White did not attend the Duke's levee, and some time later his colonel received a letter from Sir Herbert Taylor, the Duke’s military secretary, ordering White's attendance. Upon his arrival, Taylor asked White why he had neglected His Royal Highness’ request, telling him he was wrong. He added, "Do you know that I am authorised by H.R.H. to offer you a lieutenancy without purchase?” White thanked him, but declined the offer, as there was no vacancy in his regiment, and he did not wish to leave it. The military secretary then said, "If at any future time I can be of service to you in any way, make your wishes known, and they shall be attended to."

White retired from the 3rd Light Dragoons upon his first marriage, on half-pay.

For many years, White was Lieutenant-Colonel of both the Royal Sherwood Foresters Militia (commissioned 1 June 1833, resigned 1852) and also the Sherwood Rangers Yeomanry Cavalry, which had originally been raised by his father.

=== Chartist uprisings ===
In 1838, after the annual 8 days of permanent drill at Newark, the Sherwood Rangers were ordered to Mansfield in preparation for the expected uprising of the Chartists. The Chartists at Sutton-in-Ashfield were to rise first, followed by other groups across the country. However, the Chartists found that the Yeomanry were far too strong for them and also wanted to annihilate the group; thus the uprisings quickly dissipated. The regiment stayed in Mansfield for 14 days on this occasion.

White sent regular reports, using the information he had gathered about the movements and state of the Chartists, to the Home Secretary, Lord John Russell. A letter of thanks was received back from Lord John, saying the account of the intentions of the Chartists, etc., which White had given him, was the most correct in every particular of any that had been supplied to the Home Office.

=== Newark election riots ===
During the 1840 election in Newark, the Sherwood Rangers were again called out, with White at their head, having been asked for his advice as what to do by the magistrates of the town. He suggested sending for the troops, who were posted a short way from the borough. However, nobody could be found to pass the news to the troops, as they were all frightened of the rioters. White decided to volunteer himself and set-off on his mission. When he reached the bridge over the River Trent, he found a dozen or so rioters guarding it. They threatened to throw him over the parapet into the water, if he dared step onto the bridge. White was a powerful man of six feet in height. He looked round him, and called out in a loud voice, "I have no doubt you can throw me over, but I shall take care that at least one man goes over with me." The rioters were not expecting such a response and consequently were afraid to touch him; meaning he could cross the bridge and achieve his mission of calling out the troops.

=== Military career ===
Date	Regiment	Entry
9 March 1813	3rd or Retford Regiment of Nottinghamshire Local Militia	Thomas Woollaston White, Gent. to be Ensign
30 June 1813	3rd or Retford Regiment of Nottinghamshire Local Militia	Ensign Thomas Woollaston White to be Lieutenant, vice Sherratt, deceased
19 October 1820	16th Regiment of Light Dragoons	Sir Thomas Woollaston White, Bart. to be Cornet, by purchase, vice Tuite
9 May 1822	3rd Regiment of Light Dragoons	Cornet Sir Thomas Woollaston White from the 16th Light Dragoons, to be Cornet, vice Moore, who exchanges
12 November 1824	Worksop Troop of Nottinghamshire Yeomanry Cavalry	Sir Thomas Woollaston White, Bart., to be Lieutenant
1 June 1833	Royal Sherwood Foresters or Nottinghamshire Regiment of Militia	Sir Thomas Woollaston White, Bart., to be Lieutenant-Colonel, vice Roger Pocklington, retired
26 February 1836	Sherwood Rangers	Sir Thomas Woollaston White, Bart., to be Major-Commandant
29 April 1840	Sherwood Rangers	Sir Thomas Woollaston White, Bart., to be Lieutenant-Colonel

== High Sheriff of Nottinghamshire ==
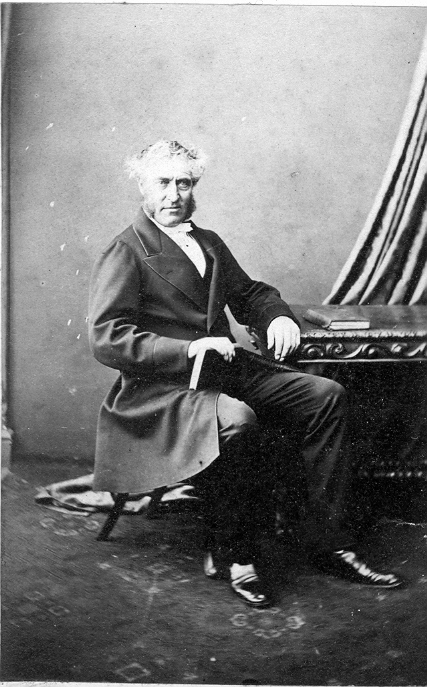
Sir Thomas White, 2nd Baronet, in his old age.

In 1833 White was chosen to be the High Sheriff of Nottinghamshire. In 1833, the full pomp and ceremony of the meeting of the assize judges was still enacted and he rode out with his javelin men, who were all his own people. They were dressed in the green and silver livery of his seat, Wallingwells, and the trumpeters had silk banners showing his achievement-of-arms of 28 quarterings. White rode a skewbold horse, which was caparisoned in the crimson velvet and gold trappings of the 1st Duke of Marlborough (the trappings came into the White family via his paternal grandmother, who was the daughter of the Duke's right-hand man, Major-General John Armstrong). Behind the javelin men and White came the judges in White's coach and four.

It is said that on one occasion when White was waiting for a judge in his coach, two old farmers came up to it, peered in through the window and eventually uttered, "Nay, he is not half so good-looking as his father were when he was Sheriff!"

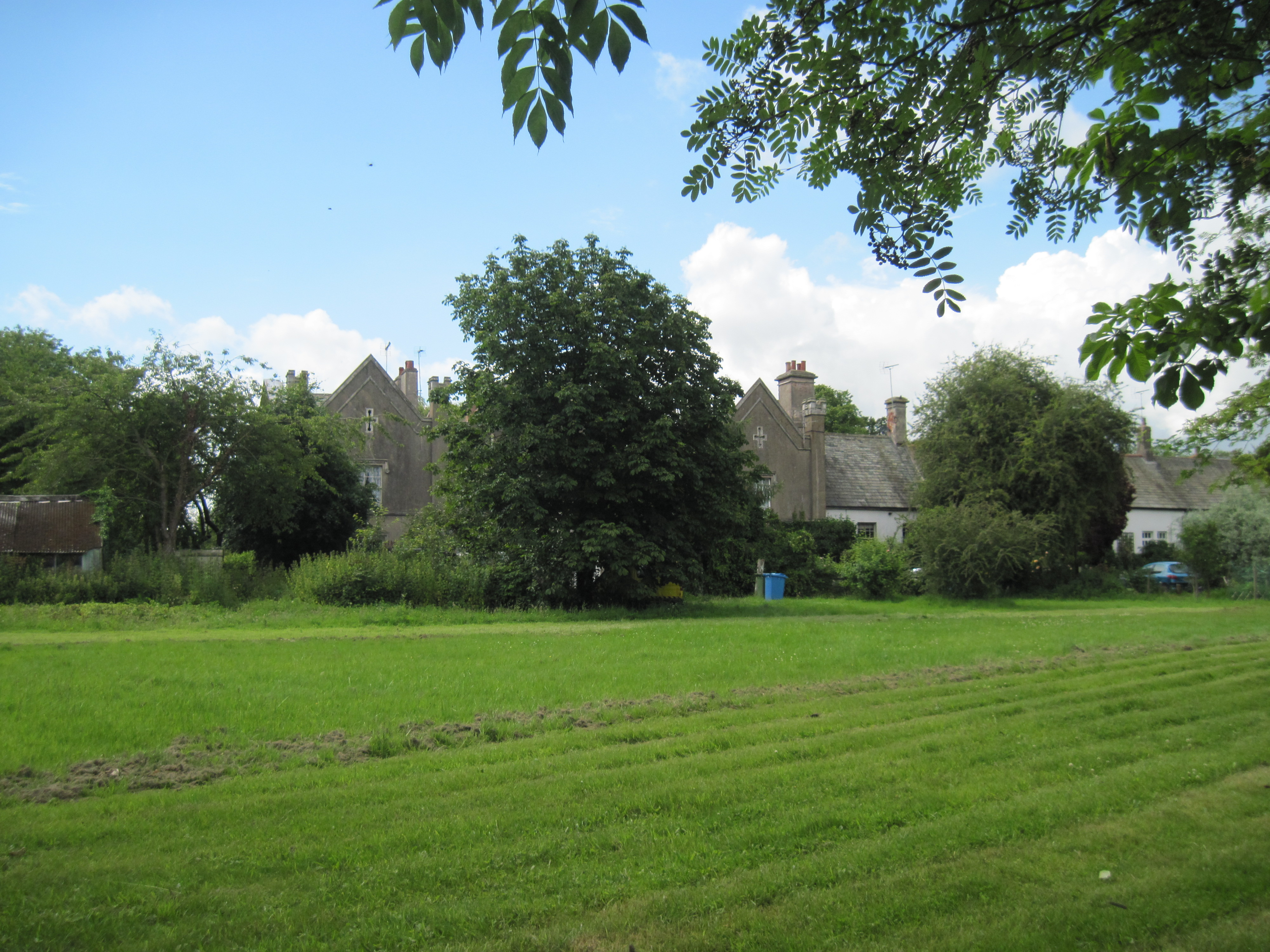
Wallingwells, Nottinghamshire

== Letwell Church ==
In 1867, Letwell Church, which stood on White's Wallingwells Estate, burnt down. He rebuilt the church at his own cost, and it reopened on 12 August 1869. The west window was dedicated to his third cousin, former guardian, and neighbour at Langold, Henry Gally Knight. Gally Knight had left his Langold estate (3,209 acres) to White, upon his death in 1846.

The three lights of the east window are memorials to White and his two wives. The font was carved by his youngest daughter, Lady Maitland, whilst the pulpit and reading desk of oak with cedar let in, were carved by another daughter, Mary.

== Carriage accident and death ==
In June 1870, when he was 68 years old, White was driving through Worksop when his horses took fright and the carriage collided with another. He was thrown out of the carriage and sustained injuries so severe that he was not expected to live. His right leg was amputated above the knee as a result of the accident. Incredibly, largely due to his constitution and calmness of mind, he recovered and survived for another 12 years.

White died on 7 August 1882 and was buried in the vault of the White chapel in the Church of St Nicholas, Tuxford.

== Succession to the baronetcy ==
White was succeeded in the baronetcy by his eldest son of the second marriage. He was also named Thomas Woollaston and was formally known as Sir Thomas Woollaston White, 3rd Baronet of Tuxford and Wallingwells.

Baronetage of the United Kingdom
Preceded by Thomas White	Baronet (of Tuxford and Wallingwells); 1817–1882	Succeeded by Thomas White
