= White baronets of Salle Park (1922) =

Escutcheon of the White baronets of Salle Park

The White baronetcy, of Salle Park in the County of Norfolk, was created in the Baronetage of the United Kingdom on 29 June 1922 for Woolmer White. The second Baronet represented Fareham in the House of Commons.

== White baronets, of Salle Park (1922) ==
- Sir Woolmer Rudolph Donati White, 1st Baronet (1858–1931)
- Sir (Rudolph) Dymoke White, 2nd Baronet (1888–1968)
- Sir Headley Dymoke White, 3rd Baronet (1914–1971)
- Sir John Woolmer White, 4th Baronet (born 1947)

The heir apparent to the baronetcy is Kyle Dymoke Wilfrid White (born 1988), only son of the 4th Baronet.
