= White baronets =

Set index for White baronets

There have been five baronetcies created for persons with the surname of White, one in the Baronetage of Great Britain and four in the Baronetage of the United Kingdom.

- White baronets of Blagdon (1756): see Viscount Ridley
- White baronets of Tuxford and Wallingwells (1802)
- White baronets of Cotham House (1904) - associated with the Bristol Aeroplane Company
- White baronets of Salle Park (1922)
- White baronets of Boulge Hall (1937)
