= Sir Thomas White, 1st Baronet =

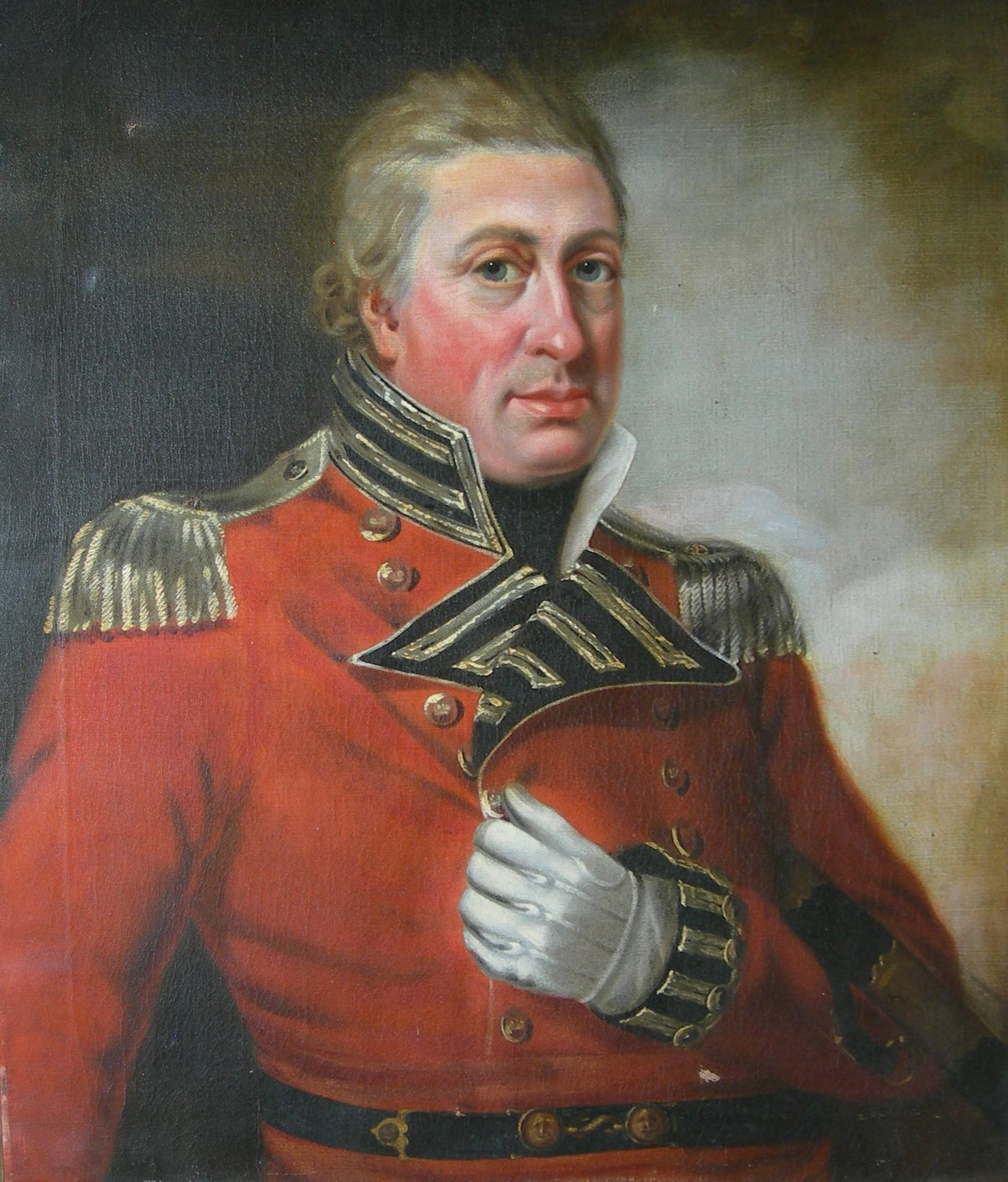
Sir Thomas White, 1st Baronet

Sir Thomas Woollaston White, 1st Baronet, of Tuxford and Wallingwells (20 January 1767 – 28 October 1817), was the eldest son and heir of Taylor and Sarah White. His grandfather, also named Taylor White, was the founding Treasurer of The Foundling Hospital, a judge, Fellow of The Royal Society, and Patron of the Arts.

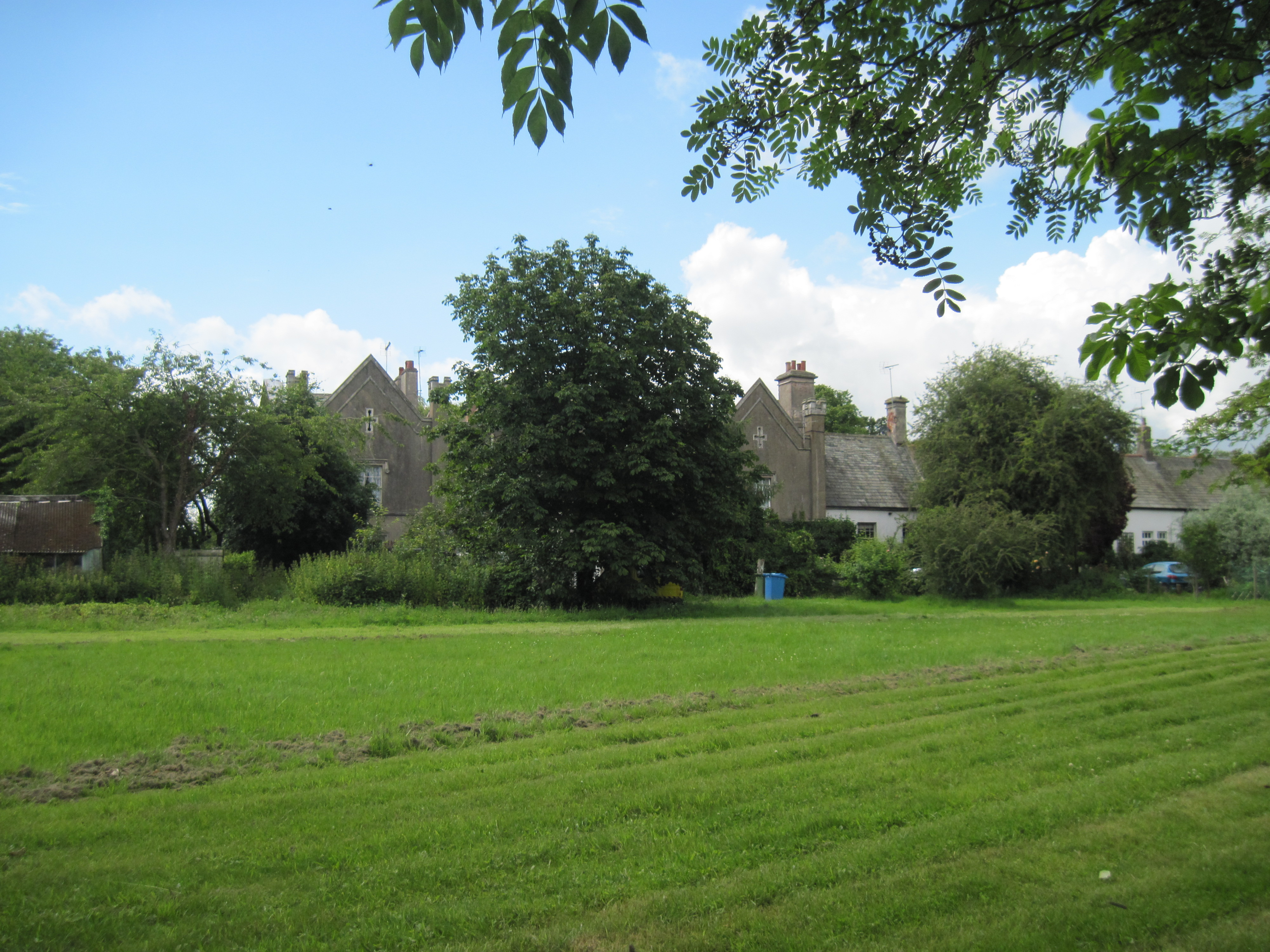
Wallingwells, Nottinghamshire

Prior to inheriting, in 1795, his father's substantial estates, including Wallingwells, he occupied himself primarily with the army and militia.

== The raising of the Sherwood Rangers Yeomanry Cavalry and the grant of baronetcy ==
When it appeared that an invasion of England by Napoleon was imminent, White twice raised, quartered, fed, clothed and armed a force of volunteers to help defend the nation. King George III heard of these deeds and offered to share half of the cost from his privy purse, as he saw this as too much a burden for a private gentleman to bear. White declined the offer, saying that he considered it the duty of every loyal gentleman to assist to the utmost of his means at such a crisis. He was subsequently rewarded by the King with a baronetcy being conferred upon him on 20 December 1802. White was subsequently known as Sir Thomas White, Bt., of Tuxford and Wallingwells.

When the corps was raised, a barrack was erected in Wallingwells Park. Some trees still stand which formed the corners of it. An oak tree is also shown at the side of the drive to Langold, in which a platform was erected. On this a sentry was posted day and night to watch for the lighting of the beacon on Gringley Hill, near Gainsborough, as a signal of the landing of the French. Two horses in the stable were kept constantly saddled, in readiness to send out to assemble the men. When the French camp at Boulogne was broken up and all fear of an invasion was past, the English Government decided to test through some part of the country the popular feeling, and to see whether there would be a general rising of the people. With this object they caused several beacons to be lighted, amongst which was Gringley. The alarm soon spread; the men of Sir Thomas' regiment assembled at Wallingwells at once, and were marched to Doncaster, the place of rendezvous. Here they learnt that the French had not landed, and after Sir Thomas had treated them to breakfast and given them a guinea apiece - he dismissed them to their homes.

The corps raised by Sir Thomas eventually became what is today known as 'A' Squadron (Sherwood Rangers Yeomanry Cavalry), The Royal Yeomanry. In 1808 Sir Thomas was also commissioned as Lieutenant-Colonel Commandant of the 3rd (Retford) Regiment, Nottinghamshire Local Militia, in which his son, the future 2nd Baronet, served as a junior officer.

== Army career ==
Sir Thomas White's career in the army was documented by the London Gazette as below.

Date	Regiment	Entry
21 March 1789	4th Regiment of Dragoons	Cornet Thomas Woollaston White to be Lieutenant, vice Robert Wilson
6 March 1790	4th Regiment of Dragoons	Lieutenant Thomas Woollaston White retires
19 March 1799	Sherwood Rangers	Thomas Woollaston White, Esq., to be Captain
17 November 1803	Sherwood Rangers	Sir Thomas Woollaston White, Bart., to be Captain
24 September 1808	3rd or Retford Regiment of Nottinghamshire Local Militia	Sir Thomas Woollaston White, Bart., to the Lieutenant-Colonel-Commandant

== Deputy Lieutenant and High Sheriff of Nottinghamshire ==
On 23 July 1803 Sir Thomas was appointed a Deputy Lieutenant of the County of Nottinghamshire.

On 1 February 1806, Sir Thomas was appointed High Sheriff of Nottinghamshire.

== Family ==
As well as his military life, White was a keen sportsman and kept a substantial stable and hawking establishment at Wallingwells. These met most days of the week and his house was renowned for its hospitality.

On 3 January 1801, White married Elizabeth Blagg, daughter of W. Blagg of Tuxford. They had 11 children, of whom 7 died young.

	Name	Born	Died
1.	Thomas Woollaston, his heir	3 October 1801	7 August 1882
2.	Sarah	27 November 1802	3 February 1810
3.	Anne	15 June 1804	12 August 1804
4.	Taylor	9 June 1805	8 June 1853
5.	Anne	15 June 1807	11 October 1874
6.	Lydia	2 April 1809	6 February 1810
7.	Frances	2 April 1809	11 February 1810
8.	Sarah	24 January 1811	4 January 1879
9.	Lydia	4 May 1814	12 November 1827
10.	Charles Lawrence	30 April 1815	30 July 1818
11.	Frances	17 June 1816	12 April 1817

== Death and burial ==
Sir Thomas died at Wallingwells of heart disease after an hour's illness on 28 October 1817. The Gentleman's Magazine (volume 87, part 2, pages 565–566) reported his final hours thus. "At Walling Wells, near Worksop, Sir Thomas Wollaston White, bart. He had been attending the sale of the late Col. Mellish's effects at Hodsock Priory; and on his way home complained of a slight pain in his arms, to which he had been occasionally subject; on his alighting from his horse the pain increased considerably. He went into the house, and placed himself upon a sofa; when, the pain continuing to increase, and extending across his chest, he desired to go to bed. His steward and a gentleman who was in the house attended him to his bed-room, and after he had been in bed a short time he said that he was easier; in a few minutes he was again seized, and almost instantly expired."

He was buried on 7 November 1817 in the new vault in the White Chapel at Tuxford Church. His widow, Elizabeth, lived until her death on 16 July 1850 at Tuxford Hall.

== Succession to the baronetcy ==
Sir Thomas was succeeded in the baronetcy by his eldest son, Sir Thomas White, 2nd Baronet, of Tuxford and Wallingwells.

Baronetage of the United Kingdom
New creation	Baronet of Tuxford and Wallingwells; 1802–1817	Succeeded by Thomas White
