= Terpsichore (disambiguation) =

Terpsichore is one of the classical Greek Muses. She is the Muse of dance and the dramatic chorus.

Terpsichore may also refer to:

- Terpsichore statuette from Dodona, a Hellenistic statuette of the goddess
- Terpsichore (1612), a compendium of more than 300 instrumental dances by Michael Praetorius
- Terpsichore (Petipa/Pugni), a ballet by Marius Petipa and Cesare Pugni
- Terpsichore (plant), a genus of ferns
- 81 Terpsichore, an asteroid
- HMS Terpsichore, any of several ships of the Royal Navy, including:
  - HMS Terpsichore (R33), a T-class destroyer active during World War II
- Terpsicore (1734), prologue by Handel to his opera Il pastor fido
