= Richard Taylor White =

British naval officer (1908–1995)

Richard Taylor White (29 January 1908 – 3 March 1995) was a British naval officer in the Second World War. He won three Distinguished Service Orders in the war, all in command of a destroyer.

== Early life ==
White was born on 29 January 1908, the second son of Lieutenant-Colonel Sir Archibald White, Bt. and his wife, Gladys (née Love). His father was a former captain of the Yorkshire County Cricket Team, as well as the 4th Baronet of Tuxford and Wallingwells. Richard was the last White to be born at Wallingwells, the family's seat since 1699, which was sold by his father in 1926.

White was sent to preparatory school at Lockers Park in Hemel Hempstead. He left as head of school and captain of cricket and rugby. Contemporary pupils included James Lees-Milne, Basil Hamilton-Temple-Blackwood (4th Marquess of Dufferin and Ava), Tom Mitford, Bob Laycock (Richard's father was a neighbour of Laycock's father, Sir Joseph, who lived at Wiseton, and served under him in World War I) and the Cold War spy, Guy Burgess. Lockers Park was also the prep school of Lord Mountbatten, whom White encountered in a professional capacity many times throughout his career in the Royal Navy.

== Royal Navy career ==
After Lockers Park, White entered Britannia Royal Naval College in Dartmouth in 1921 at the age of 13 years. During his time at the Naval College he excelled at sports, being in the cricket and rugby teams throughout his time at Dartmouth.

He became a sea-going cadet aboard the battleship HMS Benbow in May 1925, serving in the Mediterranean and Atlantic fleets. His midshipman training included service on the destroyer HMS Walpole and the aircraft carrier HMS Furious for naval aviation training.

White was commissioned as sub-lieutenant on 1 December 1928 after completing courses at the Royal Naval College, Greenwich and various other shore establishments.

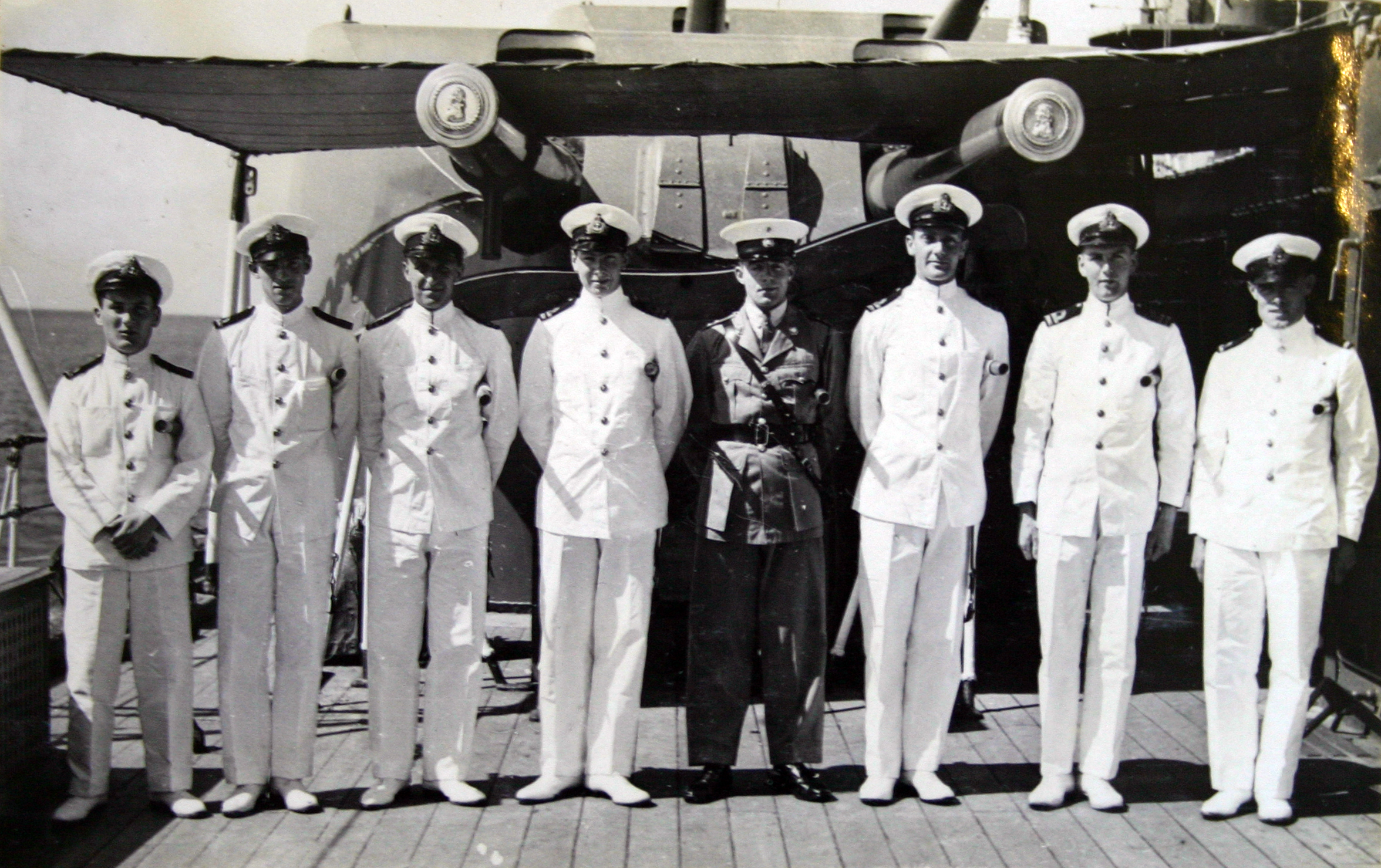
Junior officers of HMS Nelson under her main guns. R. T. White is second from the right.

White's early postings included the light cruiser HMS Carlisle on the South African Station (August 1929 – March 1930) from where he was invalided home, having suffered from malaria and the battleship HMS Nelson (May 1930 – November 1931). On 1 September 1930, he was promoted to the rank of lieutenant. During his service aboard Nelson, White was present during the Invergordon mutiny in September 1931, noting in his journal that Nelson's senior officers successfully restored discipline amongst their crew, whilst other ships experienced more serious disturbances.

White left Nelson in November 1931 when he was appointed to HMS Pembroke as flag lieutenant to Commander-in-Chief, The Nore, Admiral Sir Reginald Tyrwhitt, Bt. This appointment lasted until May 1933 when White was transferred to HMS Brilliant with the Mediterranean Fleet. He remained with Brilliant until October 1936. From January 1937 until her launch in January 1938, White was lieutenant aboard HMS Impulsive, which was being constructed. He then sailed with Impulsive in the Mediterranean until August 1938.

White received his first command on 24 September 1938, as captain of HMS Antelope, having been promoted to lieutenant commander on 1 September.

=== Channel convoys ===
Upon the outbreak of the Second World War, White was still in command of Antelope. His days were spent patrolling the English Channel's Western Approaches and escorting convoys in and out of the Channel. This was arduous work with long hours for the entire crew.

==== Sinking of U-41 and award of a first DSO ====
On 5 February 1940, White was escorting convoy OA-84 in the Channel. It was fine weather. At 1130 Antelope got an A/S contact on the port bow, some 4,000 yards (3,700 m) distant. Spotting a trace of oil, he ordered a depth charge to be released. The target moved considerably after this first attack, so Antelope turned and ran again, this time delivering a full pattern depth charge attack. A huge gush of oil surfaced and it was considered that a U-boat had been destroyed. Not long after, at 1314, a huge explosion was felt and the convoy scattered. White left the location of the first U-boat and chased on to discover that the explosion was the merchant vessel, Beaverburn, being torpedoed. Steaming at 28 knots (52 km/h; 32 mph), White got Antelope into Asdic range within 30 minutes and almost immediately picked up another U-boat. Commencing his attack, the U-boat's engines started going full speed. Full pattern attacks continued until the U-boat was finally bottomed at 1556 in 90 fathoms (540 ft; 160 m) of water. Explosions were felt. At 1730 a single depth charge attack was launched and produced a lot of oil. Antelope remained at the site until 2355 when it was considered that the U-boat was unquestionably destroyed.

At 1600 on 8 February, White was cross-examined by the Commander-in-Chief at Mount Wise about the two U-boats. It was determined he had sunk both vessels. As White recalled, "the first right and left in history!" He was subsequently appointed a Companion of the Distinguished Service Order (DSO). Upon his return home to Otterburn Towers, British Pathé filmed his welcome back to the village.

==== Sinking of U-31 and award of a second DSO ====
On 2 November 1940, White, still in command of Antelope, was escorting convoy OB237, north-west of Ireland. Contact was made with a U-boat and together with HMS Achates, Antelope started dropping patterns of depth charges. U-31 was eventually sunk by Antelope, which picked-up all but two members of the U-boat's crew of 46 men. White was awarded a first Bar to his DSO.

In February 1941, White took command of HMS Beagle, operating in the Western Approaches of the Channel and Atlantic Ocean. White was promoted to commander on 30 June 1941. He remained with Beagle until he took command of HMS Tartar on the Iceland Station on 17 February 1942. With Tartar he was involved in the search for the German battleship Tirpitz.

=== The Mediterranean ===
In April 1942, White took command of HMS Zulu, stationed in the Mediterranean Sea. Zulu was involved in patrols throughout the eastern Mediterranean, being based at either Alexandria or Haifa. On 4 August 1942, Zulu helped attack and sink U-372 together with several other destroyers. For his part in the action, White was Mentioned in Despatches for his leadership.

==== Sinking of HMS Zulu ====
On 13/14 September 1942, Zulu, together with fellow Tribal-class destroyer HMS Sikh and the light cruiser HMS Coventry took part in Operation Agreement to land troops on the Egyptian beaches at Tobruk. At 0310 Sikh and Zulu stopped two miles (3.2 km) off the beach in a considerable swell to lower the boats and land the 11th Battalion, Royal Marines. Due to the conditions, the operation took double the usual time of 20 minutes to achieve. Having moved seawards, the ships headed back towards the shore at 0414 to land the second wave of Royal Marines, moving to within a mile of the shore. At 0505, Sikh was spotted by the coastal defences and was fired upon, her aft quarter being hit at 0520, which put her starboard engine and steering out of action. By now, Zulu had also been sighted and both ships made smoke to attempt to screen themselves. White's attempts to get Sikh under tow took two attempts. At 0636 Sikh was hit three to four times by fire, as was Zulu, with one shell hitting the quarterdeck and severing the towing line. Both ships continued to be hit from shore batteries, as it was now fully daylight. At 0708 Sikh's commander ordered White to rejoin Coventry and to leave Sikh to her fate.

Zulu was under constant fire until she was six miles from shore. By now she was almost out of ammunition. At 0850 the first Ju 88 aircraft attack started, narrowly missing Zulu. Between 1115 and 1430 several more multiple aircraft attacks came, before Coventry was sighted at 1445. At 1505 Coventry was hit amidships by two torpedoes and sunk immediately. By this time HMS Hursley and HMS Croome had joined Zulu. At 1600 18 German aircraft bombed Zulu, the final bomb hitting the ship's side and entering the engine room, which caused the engine room, boiler no. 3 and gear room to be flooded and settling the ship by two feet (0.61 m). Croome was ordered alongside to disembark Zulu's crew, whilst Hursley was ordered to take Zulu in tow. White kept two officers and nine ratings on board Zulu. As Zulu was out of wire and Hursley's was not ready for use, a manilla was used to tow Zulu. This snapped after half an hour of towing. Eventually Hursley's wire was attached and Zulu was under tow again. However, by 2000 Zulu was rapidly sinking and White ordered Hursley to stop towing and Croome to pick up the remaining crew from Zulu. Zulu's final act was to roll over to starboard and sink. All twelve survivors were picked up by Hursley and HMS Hurworth, which had just joined.

For his part in the action, White was awarded the second Bar to his DSO.

=== Royal Hellenic Navy ===
From October 1942 to March 1943, White was given command of the corvette HMS Hyacinth and was seconded to the Royal Hellenic Navy as a liaison officer. In 1945 the King of the Hellenes appointed White to the Royal Order of the Phoenix with Swords, for distinguished services to the Royal Hellenic Navy. King George VI granted White unrestricted permission to wear the decoration.

=== D-Day landings ===
On D-Day, 6 June 1944, White was in command of the light cruiser HMS Despatch. Despatch was designated the command ship for the Mulberry harbours at Gold Beach. White was given landing pass "Number One" for Gold Beach at Arromanches.

=== Far East ===
In January 1945, White, by now with the rank, Acting Captain, was in command of HMS Terpsichore. Terpsichore left for Australia in March 1945, where she was to join the United States Navy's Task Force 57. Having exercised in the Mediterranean on her way to Sydney, From Sydney, Terpsichore sailed for Manus Island off Papua New Guinea to join the British Pacific Fleet, seconded to the United States Fifth Fleet as a part of Task Force 57.

On 2 September 1945, White sailed Terpsichore into Tokyo Bay, as the lead ship in the USS Mississippi battle group, for the formal surrender of Japan, ending the Second World War. Whilst in Tokyo, he received a Samurai sword and a pair of Nikkon naval binoculars.

== Postwar ==
On 5 October 1945, White transferred to command the battleship HMS King George V on her return voyage to England. In January 1946 the Duke and Duchess of Gloucester were on board during their tour of Australia, as Governor-General of Australia. White's time in command of King George V ended upon her arrival in Portsmouth on 6 March 1946. This was not the happiest of his sea-going postings, as many of those on board the battleship were to be demobbed upon arrival home. On 1 January 1946, White was promoted to the rank of captain, making him the youngest captain in the Royal Navy at that time. For his services during the winding up in the Far East, White was again Mentioned in Despatches. For most of the rest of 1946 until he went back to sea, White had a number of shore-based duties, including duty with the Second Sea Lord at the Admiralty and Naval Assistant to the Admiral Commanding, Reserves.

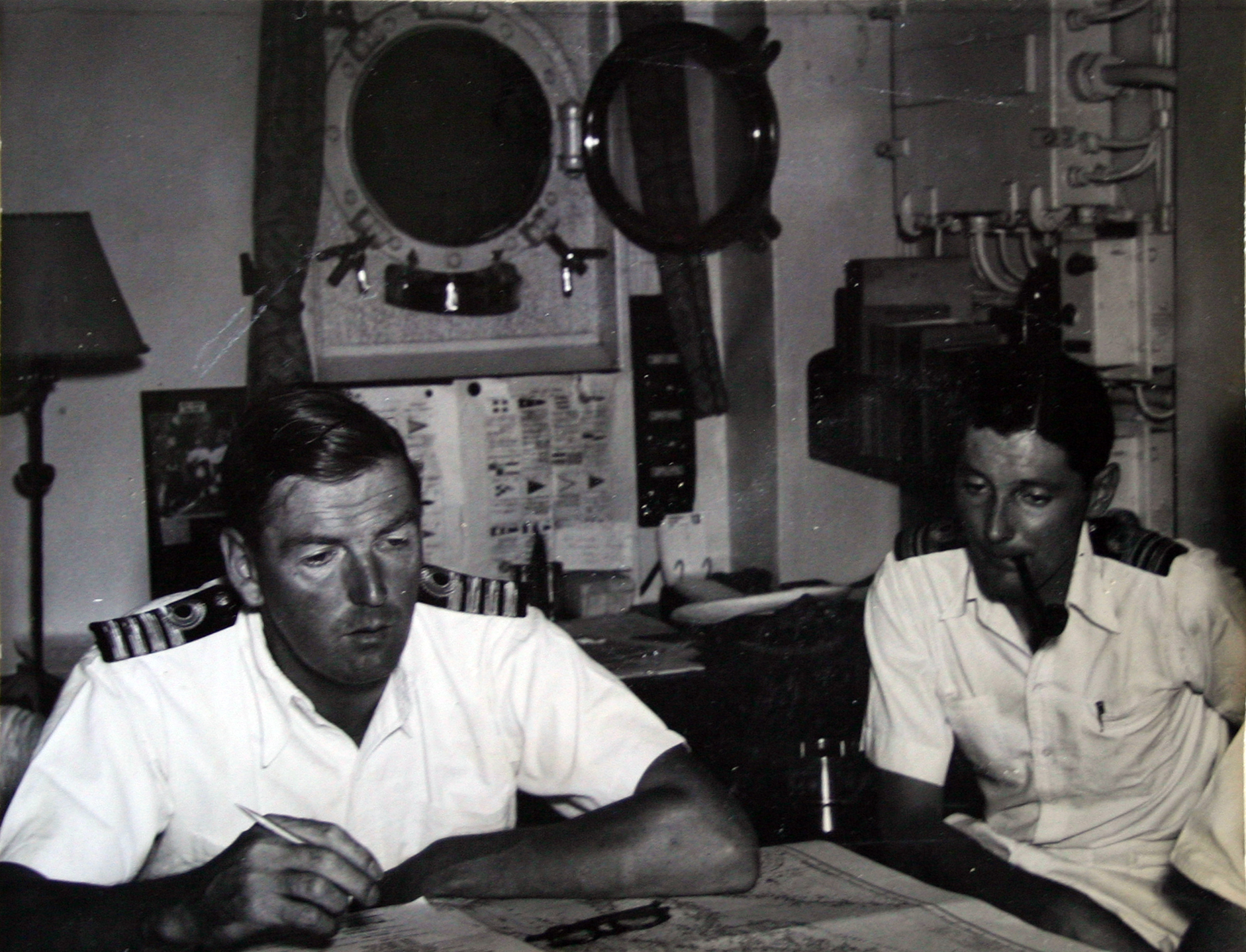
Captain R.T. White, DSO** in his cabin on HMS Cossack during the Korean War

=== Korean War ===
In February 1949, White was back at sea and war, in command of HMS Cossack during the Korean War. His position was Captain (D), 8th Destroyer Squadron. His duties included coastal bombardment of Korea. On 13 May 1950, White stopped and boarded the coastal freighter, Ethel Moller, a vessel which had been hijacked by Chinese Nationalists in February of that year. The Chinese were arrested and the ship escorted to Hong Kong. There was widespread press coverage of White's deeds. He was Mentioned in Despatches in February 1951 for service off Korea.

=== Captain BRNC, Dartmouth ===
From April 1951 till May 1953, White returned to Dartmouth where his naval career began. This time he was appointed captain in charge and in command of Britannia Royal Naval College. His tenure coincided with the Coronation of Queen Elizabeth II, which meant he was responsible for supplying a significant contingent of naval cadets to line the procession route. Whilst at Dartmouth, he was much amused to learn that the "box search" pattern he used to destroy U-41 was being taught as the classic anti-submarine manoeuvre.

=== HMS Glory ===
White's final sea-going appointment was as captain of the aircraft carrier HMS Glory in September 1953. Prior to this command, White took the Captain's Air Course at RNAS Culdrose. Glory was with the Home Fleet during this period. White left Glory in 1954.

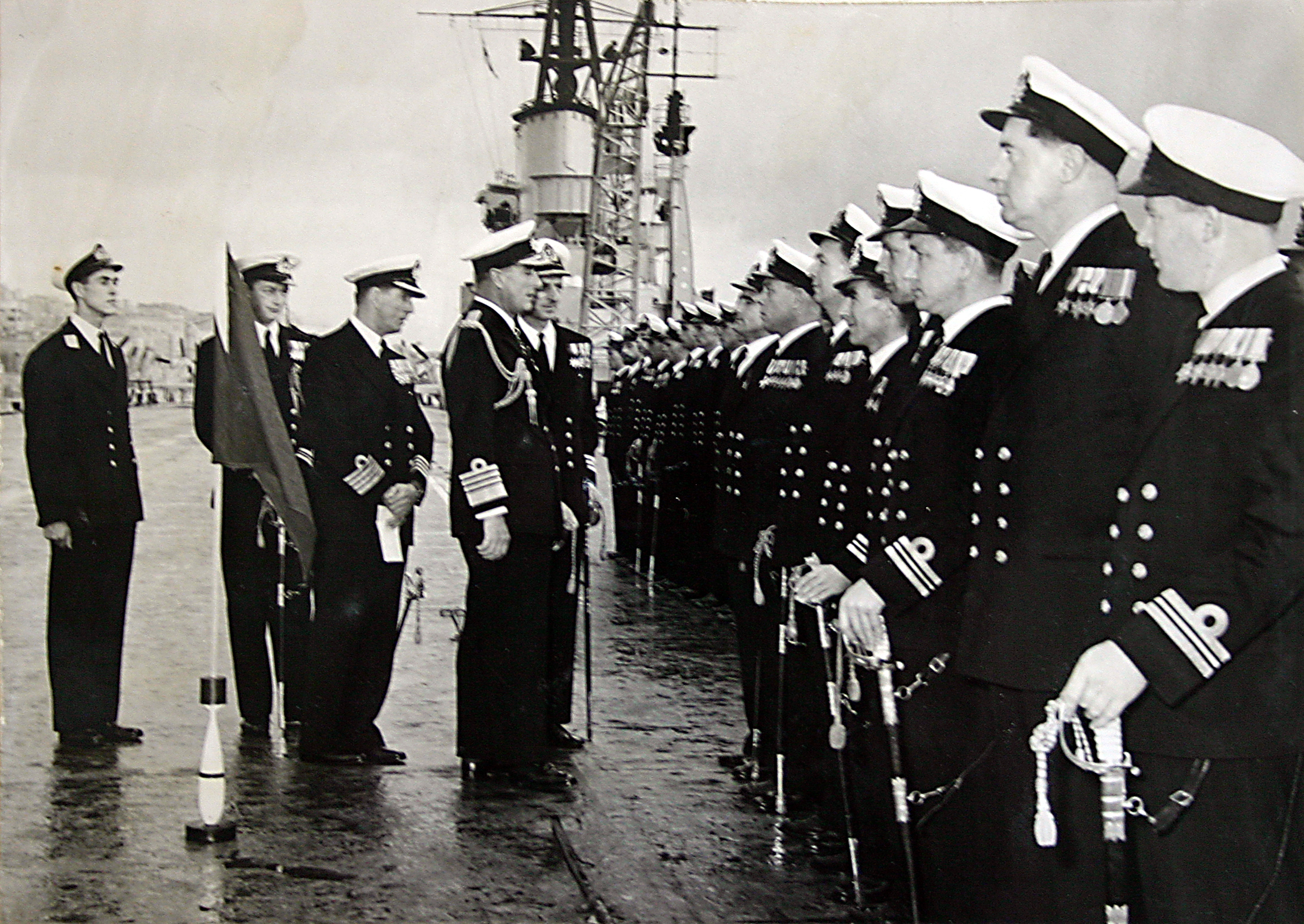
Captain R.T. White DSO** on board HMS Glory, standing behind Admiral Lord Mountbatten

=== ADC to the Queen and retirement ===
White's final appointment in the Royal Navy was as Naval ADC to Queen Elizabeth II from January to July 1955. He retired from the Royal Navy on 7 July 1955.

== Post-naval career ==
Following his retirement from the Royal Navy, White worked as a salesman for Ventaxia and then Caffyns Motor Group in Maidstone. He continued to be actively engaged with many of his former fellow officers and crews, regularly arranging dinners and meetings well into his old age. White died on 3 March 1995 at Lavenders Nursing Home in West Malling. His final years had been plagued with chronic emphysemia, the result of his early years spent in the coal-fired ships of the Royal Navy, exposed to the coal dust during re-coaling.

== Family ==
White married (Gabrielle) Ursula Style at Boxley in Kent on 2 September 1936 in a traditional naval wedding. Ursula was the daughter of Captain Robert Style, a former High Sheriff of Kent. Between them, they had five children:

1. Victoria Rosamond (5 July 1937 – 1 September 2022)
2. Nicholas Peter Archibald (b. 2 March 1939) – succeeded his father's elder brother as Sir Nicholas White, 6th Baronet of Tuxford and Wallingwells in May 1996.)
3. Jocelyn Henrietta (b. 12 January 1943)
4. Robert Leslie (b. 19 August 1945)
5. Richard Mark (b. 19 August 1945)

== Honours and awards ==
- Companion of the Distinguished Service Order (11 July 1940)
- Bar to the Distinguished Service Order (14 January 1941)
- Mentioned in Despatches (20 October 1942)
- Second Bar to the Distinguished Service Order (22 December 1942)
- Royal Order of the Phoenix with Swords (Greece 6 March 1945)
- Mentioned in Despatches (11 June 1946)
- Mentioned in Despatches (2 February 1951)

White is mentioned in Alastair Wilson and Joseph F Callo's book Who's Who In Naval History From 1550 To The Present.
