= HMS Zulu (F18) =

Destroyer of the Royal Navy

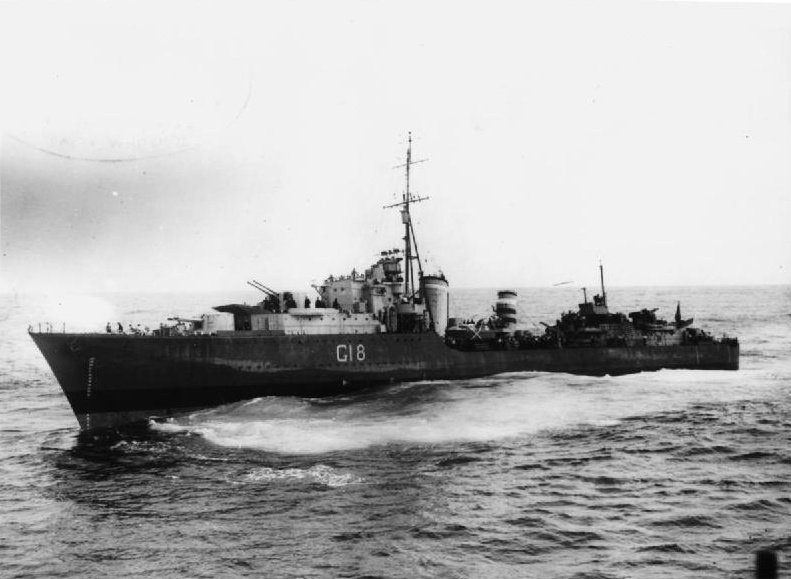
- Zulu

History

United Kingdom
- Name: Zulu
- Namesake: Zulu people
- Ordered: 10 March 1936
- Builder: Alexander Stephen and Sons, Linthouse
- Cost: £351,135
- Laid down: 27 August 1936
- Launched: 23 September 1937
- Completed: 6 September 1938
- Identification: Pennant numbers: L18, later F18
- Fate: Sunk by aircraft, 14 September 1942
- Badge: On a Field Barry, wavy of six white and blue; in front of two Zulu spears in saltire surmounted a Zulu shield all proper

General characteristics (as built)
- Class & type: Tribal-class destroyer
- Displacement: 1,891 long tons (1,921 t) (standard); 2,519 long tons (2,559 t) (deep load)
- Length: 377 ft (114.9 m) (o/a)
- Beam: 36 ft 6 in (11.13 m)
- Draught: 11 ft 3 in (3.43 m)
- Installed power: 3 × Admiralty 3-drum boilers; 44,000 shp (33,000 kW)
- Propulsion: 2 × shafts; 2 × geared steam turbines
- Speed: 36 knots (67 km/h; 41 mph)
- Range: 5,700 nmi (10,600 km; 6,600 mi) at 15 knots (28 km/h; 17 mph)
- Complement: 190
- Sensors & processing systems: ASDIC
- Armament: 4 × twin 4.7 in (120 mm) guns; 1 × quadruple 2-pdr (40 mm (1.6 in)) AA guns; 2 × quadruple 0.5 in (12.7 mm) anti-aircraft machineguns; 1 × quadruple 21 in (533 mm) torpedo tubes; 20 × depth charges, 1 × rack, 2 × throwers

HMS Zulu was a Tribal-class destroyer of the Royal Navy and the second ship to bear the name. Built in Glasgow by Alexander Stephen and Sons, her keel was laid down on 10 August 1936, she was launched on 23 September 1937 and commissioned on 7 September 1938.

Zulu was sunk by German or Italian aircraft on 14 September 1942, off Tobruk. Some sources credit Junkers Ju 87 "Stuka" dive bombers from StG 3 with her sinking, but the ship's commanding officer testified she was sunk by a combination of Ju 87s and Junkers Ju 88s.

== Description ==
The Tribals were intended to counter the large destroyers being built by other nations and to improve the firepower of the existing destroyer flotillas and were significantly larger and more heavily armed than the preceding I class. The ships displaced 1,891 long tons (1,921 t) at standard load and 2,519 long tons (2,559 t) at deep load. They had an overall length of 377 feet (114.9 m), a beam of 36 feet 6 inches (11.13 m) and a draught of 11 feet 3 inches (3.43 m). The destroyers were powered by two Parsons geared steam turbines, each driving one propeller shaft using steam provided by three Admiralty three-drum boilers. The turbines developed a total of 44,000 shaft horsepower (33,000 kW) and gave a maximum speed of 36 knots (67 km/h; 41 mph). During her sea trials Zulu made 34.9 knots (64.6 km/h; 40.2 mph) from 44,463 shp (33,156 kW) at a displacement of 2,212 long tons (2,247 t). The ships carried enough fuel oil to give them a range of 5,700 nautical miles (10,600 km; 6,600 mi) at 15 knots (28 km/h; 17 mph). The ships' complement consisted of 190 officers and ratings, although the flotilla leaders carried an extra 20 officers and men consisting of the Captain (D) and his staff.

The primary armament of the Tribal-class was eight quick-firing (QF) 4.7-inch (120 mm) Mark XII guns in four superfiring twin-gun mounts, one pair each fore and aft of the superstructure, designated 'A', 'B', 'X', and 'Y' from front to rear. The mounts had a maximum elevation of 40°. For anti-aircraft (AA) defence, they carried a quadruple mount for the QF two-pounder Mk II "pom-pom" gun and two quadruple mounts for the 0.5-inch (12.7 mm) Mark III machine guns. Low-angle fire for the main guns was controlled by the director-control tower (DCT) on the bridge roof that fed data acquired by it and the 12-foot (3.7 m) rangefinder on the Mk II Rangefinder/Director directly aft of the DCT to an analogue mechanical computer, the Mk I Admiralty Fire Control Clock. Anti-aircraft fire for the main guns was controlled by the Rangefinder/Director which sent data to the mechanical Fuze Keeping Clock.

The ships were fitted with an above-water quadruple mount for 21-inch (533 mm) torpedoes. The Tribals were not intended as anti-submarine ships, but they were provided with ASDIC, one depth charge rack and two throwers for self-defence, although the throwers were not mounted in all ships; Twenty depth charges was the peacetime allotment, but this increased to 30 during wartime.

=== Wartime modifications ===
Heavy losses to German air attack during the Norwegian Campaign demonstrated the ineffectiveness of the Tribals' anti-aircraft suite and the RN decided in May 1940 to replace 'X' mount with two QF 4-inch (102 mm) Mark XVI dual-purpose guns in a twin-gun mount. To better control the guns, the existing rangefinder/director was modified to accept a Type 285 gunnery radar as they became available. The number of depth charges was increased to 46 early in the war, and still more were added later. To increase the firing arcs of the AA guns, the rear funnel was shortened and the mainmast was reduced to a short pole mast. and two, single 2 pounder guns were mounted on the bridge wings.

== Construction and career ==
Authorized as one of seven Tribal-class destroyers under the 1935 Naval Estimates, Zulu was the second ship of her name to serve in the Royal Navy. The ship was ordered on 10 March 1936 from Alexander Stephen and Sons and was laid down on 27 August at the company's Linthouse shipyard. Launched on 23 September 1937, Zulu was commissioned on 6 September 1938 at a cost of £351,135 which excluded weapons and communications equipment that would be furnished by the Admiralty.

During 1940 she developed engine trouble and was dry docked for repairs and degaussing. She returned to service in early March when she was employed escorting convoys around the Western Approaches. In June 1941, she sailed to Falmouth for a refit. Following this, she was attached to Force H at Gibraltar. On 4 August 1942, Zulu with Sikh, Croome and Tetcott attacked and sank U-372 off Haifa and Zulu's commanding officer, Commander R.T. White, DSO was Mentioned in Despatches for his leadership.

In April 1941 she was assigned to provide Atlantic convoy defence as part of the RN's 4th Destroyer flotilla. On 22nd May 1941 she joined military convoy WS8B as local escort during its passage in the western Approaches together with HMS Cairo, and the destroyers HMS Cossack, Bridge, Maori, Ottawa (RCN), ORP Piorun (Polish), Sikh & Restigouche (RCN). On the 26th May she was detached from the escort to relieve the destroyer escorts of HMS King George V during her search for German Battleship Bismarck. on the 27th she carried out torpedo attacks on Bismarck with destroyers of RN's 4th destroyer Flotilla.

On the 14 September Zulu, Sikh and the light cruiser, Coventry landed and covered Operation Agreement, a commando raid on Tobruk. Sikh was hit and sunk by 152 mm Italian coastal artillery, German 88 mm guns and a bomb dropped by a Macchi C.200. 115 men were killed but Zulu was able to save lives of several of her crew. Later the same day, Coventry was heavily damaged by Junkers Ju 88s of Lehrgeschwader 1. Dead in the water, on fire and with 63 killed she was scuttled by gunfire and torpedoes from Zulu. Aircraft continued to attack Zulu and she was badly damaged and left without engine power an hour later. According to her commanding officer, the attack was carried out by a combination of Ju 88s and Ju 87s.

The type II Hunt-class destroyer, HMS Croome came alongside to take off the surviving personnel, save for a towing party and Zulu was taken under tow by HMS Hursley. By 19:00 hours and a hundred miles from Alexandria, it was clear she was sinking and the towing party was recovered after a strafing pass by an enemy aircraft. Soon after, Zulu rolled to starboard and sank in position 32°00′N 28°56′E. Across both attacks, twelve men were killed, twenty-seven were missing and one was wounded.
