= French ship Terpsichore =

Four ships of the French navy have borne the name Terpsichore, after Terpsichore, one of the Muses of Greek mythology:

== Ships named Terpsichore ==
- Terpsichore (1758), a 26-gun frigate, captured in 1760 by HMS Aeolus, Pallas and Brilliant, and taken into British service as HMS Terpsichore. Sold in 1766.
- Terpsichore (1763), a 36-gun frigate
- Terpsichore (1812), a 40-gun frigate
- Terpsichore (1827), a 60-gun frigate

== See also ==
- HMS Terpsichore

== Notes and references ==
Notes

Bibliography

- Roche, Jean-Michel (2005). Dictionnaire des bâtiments de la flotte de guerre française de Colbert à nos jours. Vol. 1. Group Retozel-Maury Millau. ISBN 978-2-9525917-0-6. OCLC 165892922.
