= HMS Chrysanthemum (1917) =

Minesweeper of the Royal Navy

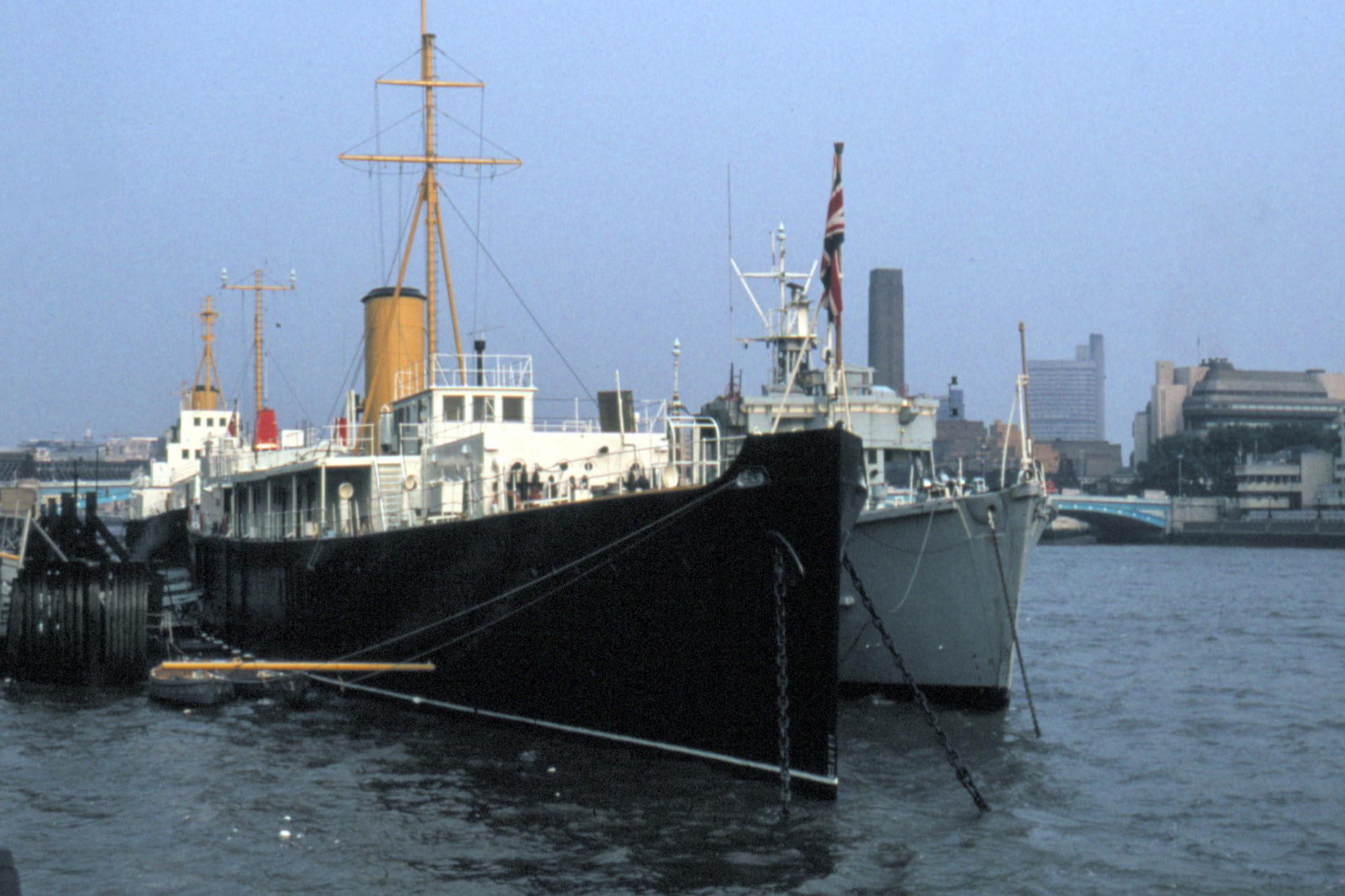
- HMS Chrysanthemum moored on the Thames next to minesweeper HMS Glasserton in 1983

History

United Kingdom
- Name: HMS Chrysanthemum
- Builder: Armstrong Whitworth
- Launched: 10 November 1917
- Commissioned: 1917
- Decommissioned: 1988
- Fate: Scrapped, 1995

General characteristics
- Class & type: Anchusa-class sloop
- Displacement: 1,290 long tons (1,311 t)
- Length: 250 ft (76 m) p/p; 262 ft 3 in (79.93 m) o/a
- Beam: 35 ft (11 m)
- Draught: 11 ft 6 in (3.51 m) (mean)
- Propulsion: 4-cylinder triple expansion engine; 2 boilers; 2,500 hp (1,864 kW); 1 screw; 260 tons of coal
- Speed: 16 knots (30 km/h; 18 mph)
- Complement: 93
- Armament: 2 × QF 4 inch Mk IV guns or BL 4 inch Mk IX guns; 2 × 12-pounder guns; Depth charge throwers

HMS Chrysanthemum was an Anchusa-class sloop of the Royal Navy, launched on 10 November 1917. She received a Le Cheminant chronometer from the Royal Observatory on 15 May 1925. After service in the Mediterranean, in 1938 she became a drill ship with Royal Naval Volunteer Reserve (RNVR) and then the Royal Naval Reserve (RNR). She was sold in 1988 to private owners and subsequently scrapped in 1995.

== Construction and design ==
Chrysanthemum was one of 20 Anchusa-class convoy sloops ordered on 21 February 1917. The ship was laid down at Armstrong Whitworth's High Walker, Newcastle upon Tyne shipyard as Yard number 929 on 9 July 1917 and was launched on 10 November 1917. Chrysanthemum was completed on 8 February 1918.

The Anchusas were the final group of Flower-class sloops, and were intended primarily for anti-submarine duties. As such they were designed to look like merchant ships so hostile submarines would remain on the surface for long enough for the sloops to engage them. The detailed appearance varied between builders and even between ships build by the same builder, (Note: Armstrongs built at least three versions of the Anchusa design.) while armament also varied.

Chrysanthemum was 276 ft 6 in (84.28 m) long overall and 255 ft 3 in (77.80 m) between perpendiculars, with a beam of 35 ft 1 in (10.69 m) and a draught of 11 ft (3.35 m). Displacement was about 1,290 long tons (1,310 t) normal. Two coal-fed boilers fed steam to a three-cylinder triple-expansion steam engine rated at 2,500–2,700 ihp (1,900–2,000 kW) giving a speed of 17–17.5 kn (19.6–20.1 mph; 31.5–32.4 km/h). The ship had a crew of 82 officers and men.

Chrysanthemum was built with a gun armament of two 4-inch BL guns, a single 12-pounder (3-inch, 76 mm) gun on a tilting mounting, a single 2 1/2-pounder gun and a machine gun. (Note: The 2 1/2-pounder gun was a 1.85 in (47 mm) gun, similar to the QF 3-pounder Hotchkiss but firing a lighter shell, which had been supplied by Elswick Ordnance Company to Japan from 1894. Eighty-four examples were supplied back to Britain by Japan after the start of the First World War.) Two 18-inch (450 mm) torpedo tubes were fitted, together with an anti-submarine 200-lb stick bomb mortar and four depth-charge throwers.

== Sea service ==
Chrysanthemum was deployed to Gibraltar after commissioning. By July 1918, the Gibraltar-based sloops, including Chrysanthemum were organised into the 11th Sloop Flotilla. Chrysanthemum remained part of the 11th Sloop Flotilla when the First World War ended on 11 November 1918. After convoy duty in the late stages of World War I, Chrysanthemum joined the Mediterranean Fleet, serving as a target towing ship, based at Malta.

In October 1921, Chrysanthemum took part in the repatriation of Turkish Prisoners of War from Malta to İnebolu, with the Turkish prisoners being exchanged for British prisoners. On 4 March 1927, Sir Walter Congreve VC, the Governor of Malta, was buried at sea from her in accordance with his last request. Chrysanthemum was also used at the beginning of the Spanish Civil War in 1936 to rescue British nationals from Barcelona. The officer recorded commanding Chrysanthemum 1935-1936 was Captain Russell Hamilton McBean, one of the men of the 1919 raid on Kronstadt.

== RNVR and RNR service ==
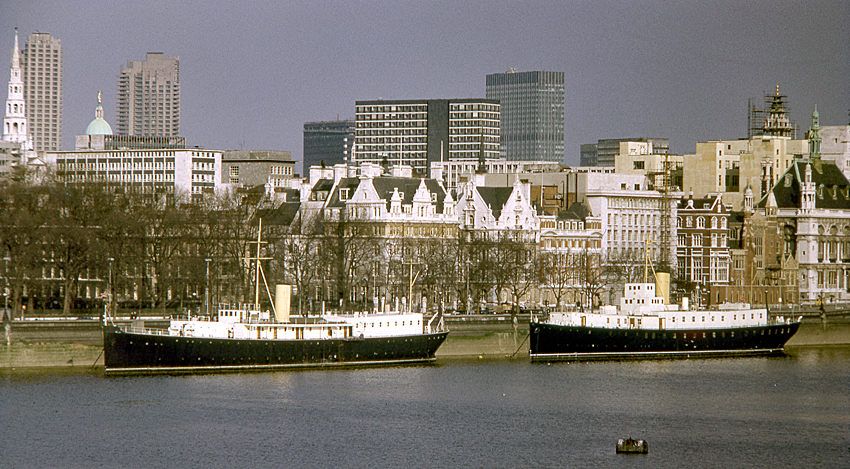
HMS Chrysanthemum & HMS President moored on the Victoria Embankment, 1975

In 1938 HMS Chrysanthemum was docked permanently on the River Thames next to HMS President for use as a drill ship by the RNR. During the Second World War she was used as a boot camp for navy recruits. After the war she continued as an RNR base. There was even a rugby union club based on her. As a warship in Commission she correctly wore the White Ensign during her time as a drill ship of London Division RNR.

== Fate ==
As part of the move of the RNR to a new purpose built shore based drill ship HMS President in St Katharine Docks, London, Chrysanthemum was decommissioned. She was later sold to the charity Inter-Action in 1988.

Chrysanthemum was hired to Steven Spielberg for the boat chase sequences shot in 1988 in Tilbury Docks for the film Indiana Jones and the Last Crusade. She was given the fictional name Tiber for the film. She was then laid up on the River Medway, where the brackish water rusted her hull so badly that she was scrapped in 1995.

== Bibliography ==
- Brook, Peter (1999). Warships for Export: Armstrong Warships 1867 – 1927. Gravesend, UK: World Ship Society. ISBN 0-905617-89-4.
- Colledge, J. J.; Warlow, Ben (2006) [1969]. Ships of the Royal Navy: The Complete Record of All Fighting Ships of the Royal Navy from the 15th Century to the Present (3rd Rev ed.). London: Chatham Publishing. ISBN 978-1-86176-281-8. OCLC 67375475.
- Dorling, Taprell (1935). Swept Channels: Being an Account of the Work of the Minesweepers in the Great War. London: Hodder and Stoughton Limited.
- Friedman, Norman (2011). Naval Weapons of World War One: Guns, Torpedoes, Mines and ASW Weapons of All Nations: An Illustrated Directory. Barnsley, UK: Seaforth Publishing. ISBN 978-1-84832-100-7.
- Gardiner, Robert; Gray, Randal, eds. (1985). Conway's All The World's Fighting Ships 1906–1921. London: Conway Maritime Press. ISBN 0-85177-245-5.
