= Le Cheminant =

English watch company

Le Cheminant Watch Company is a brand that dates back to the first half of the 19th century. Originally a jeweller, it has since become principally a watch maker and, in the early 20th century, supplied chronometers and deck watches to the Royal Navy. Since the 1950s it has concentrated on watches and is currently based in Surrey, England.

== Company history ==
The known references for Le Cheminant begin in February 1847, when Mr. Le Cheminant, a jeweller, has a shop at 72 Wimpole Street, London. The British Museum has a rare watch paper which places him at the virtually identical address of 72A, Wimpole Street. Although John Le Cheminant, "watchmaker and jeweller" died on 1 February 1876, the name continued, with Le Cheminant appearing in trade directories as 'watch maker' at the same address, 72a Wimpole Street, in 1884. By 1915 Le Cheminant has an address at 81 Wigmore Street, in the same London district, and was inscribing this address on its timepieces.

At this time Le Cheminant was among several companies which supplied precision timepieces to the British Royal Navy. In 1909 and 1915 the Royal Navy bought chronometers costing £19 and £16 10/- that saw service on HMS Dido and HMS Titania respectively. The Royal Navy also purchased deck watches from Le Cheminant – a batch of six in December 1915, costing between £5 5/- and £5 15/-, and another batch of six in December 1915, costing between £6 5/- and £6 15/-. Most of these were retired from service in the 1930s. Until then, the watches served on a variety of ships, including Motor Torpedo Boats (HTMB 033, 052 and 055); HMS L1, a British L-class submarine; P15, a Royal Navy patrol vessel, and HMS Collingwood.

By 1923 Le Cheminant had become Le Cheminant and Co, at 97 Wigmore Street on the corner of Duke Street. Classified ads appeared frequently with this address in The Times until December 1933, offering the reassuring information in 1927 that they had been established 100 years and, in 1929, that Le Cheminant had been established in 1822, significant because this date became a strong feature of the brand in later years.

By September 1957 Le Cheminant was bought by Suffolk-based retail watchmakers and jewellers, the Betts family. Antony, Stuart and Gordon Betts were brothers and directors of Betts (Ipswich) Ltd. The main branch of Le Cheminant, however, was at 106 Wigmore Street, and the 1967 catalogue lists branches in Norwich (17 Castle Street), Leicester (1 Odeon Arcade, Market Place) and Bristol (81, The Horsefair).

Among the Le Cheminant models at this time were ladies' watches with a variety of gold bracelets, children's watches, pendant and nurses' watch. All incorporated the Incabloc shock protection system. The Master Mariner series was one of their best-known lines and some models bore a close resemblance to high-end models on the market, such as the Precision Astrochon by Ollech & Wajs and chronographs by Rotary Watches.

On the retirement of the Betts family, the company was taken over by Peter Reade, who ran it in Ipswich until 2007, when it was purchased by the present owner, Stephen Grostate.

== Royal Naval vessel pieces ==
Vessels which received Le Cheminant chronographs and deck watches from the Royal Observatory, Greenwich
Type	Vessel	Date	reference
Chronometer	HMS Dido	17 March 1916	
Chronometer	HMS Titania, a submarine depot ship	22 April 1916	
Chronometer	HMS Chrysanthemum	15 May 1925	
Deck watch	HMTB 033	12 January 1916	
Deck watch	HMS Verdun	13 August 1927	
Deck watch	HM Oil Tanker War Sepoy	26 August 1927	
Deck watch	HMS Despatch	23 January 1933	
Deck watch	HMS "P15"	1 April 1916	
Deck watch	HMS Malaya	5 April 1933	
Deck watch	HMS Selkirk	12 November 1934	
Deck watch	HMTB 052		
Deck watch	HMS/nr "L1"		
Deck watch	HMTB 055	13 January 1916	
Deck watch	RFA War Sepoy	31 May 1933	
Deck watch	HMS Collingwood	7 July 1916	
Deck watch	HMS Resolution	6 January 1928	
Deck watch	HMS Alarm	13 January 1916	
Deck watch	HMS Obdurate	30 March 1916	
Deck watch	HMS Roxburgh	17 June 1916	
Deck watch	HMS Resolution	23 December 1916	
Deck watch	HMS Caradox	11 July 1930	
Deck watch	HMS Hermes	23 October 1934	
Deck watch	RFA Silverol	27 December 1916	
Deck watch	HMS Whitley	17 September 1920	
Deck watch	HM Tug St Martin	2 May 1927	
Deck watch	HMS Greenwich	22 November 1917	
Deck watch	HMS Durban	31 August 1931	
Deck watch	HMS Shark	16 November 1934	
Deck watch	HMS Acasta	19 February 1936	
Deck watch	HMS Trinidad	4 February 1929	
Deck watch	HMS Submarine E51	1 January 1917	
Deck watch	HMS Surprise	2 January 1917	
Deck watch	HMTr William Hutchinson, Admiralty Trawler	26 June 1918	
Deck watch	HMS Ormonde	5 March 1924	
Deck watch	HMS Whitehall	14 August 1928	

== Distribution and repairs ==
New Le Cheminant designs are only available from the brand owner, Stephen Grostate, who also repairs existing models.
