= HMS Verdun =

Destroyer of the Royal Navy

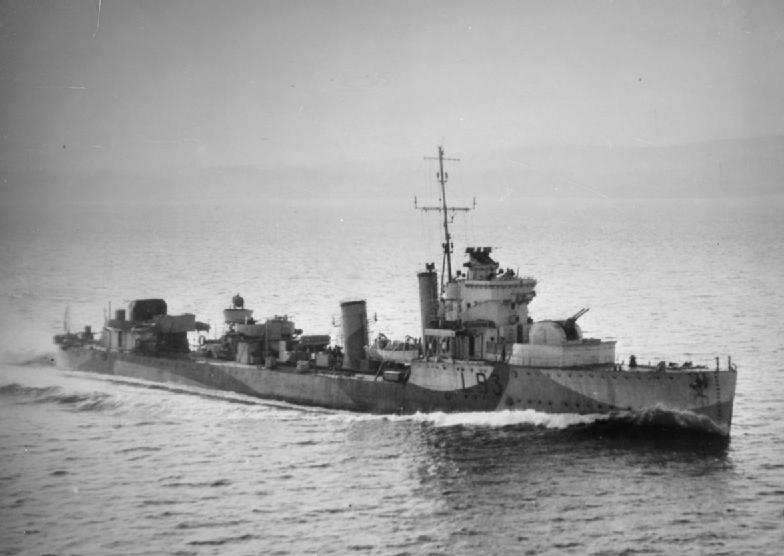
- HMS Verdun underway during the Second World War

History

United Kingdom
- Name: HMS Verdun
- Namesake: Battle of Verdun
- Ordered: 1916–17
- Builder: Hawthorn Leslie and Company
- Laid down: 13 January 1917
- Launched: 21 August 1917
- Commissioned: 3 November 1917
- In service: Converted to long-range escort between 1939 and 1940
- Identification: Pennant number: D93/L93
- Motto: On ne passe pas: 'They shall not pass'
- Honours and awards: North Sea 1940–45; Arctic 1942
- Fate: Sold for scrap in April 1946
- Badge: On a Field Paly, of three Blue, White and Red, a tower Gold.

General characteristics
- Class & type: Admiralty V-class destroyer
- Displacement: 1,272–1,339 tons
- Length: 300 ft (91.4 m) o/a, 312 ft (95.1 m) p/p
- Beam: 26 ft 9 in (8.2 m)
- Draught: 9 ft (2.7 m) standard, 11 ft 3 in (3.4 m) deep
- Propulsion: 3 Yarrow type Water-tube boilers; Brown-Curtis steam turbines, 2 shafts, 27,000 shp (20,000 kW)
- Speed: 34 knots (63 km/h; 39 mph)
- Range: 320–370 tons oil, 3,500 nmi (6,500 km; 4,000 mi) at 15 kn (28 km/h; 17 mph), 900 nmi (1,700 km; 1,000 mi) at 32 kn (59 km/h; 37 mph)
- Complement: 110
- Armament: 4 × QF 4 in Mk.V (102mm L/45), mount P Mk.I; 2 × QF 2 pdr Mk.II "pom-pom" (40 mm L/39) or; 1 × 12 pounder 12 gun Mk.I (76 mm), mount HA Mk.II; 4 (2x2) tubes for 21 inch (533 mm) torpedoes

HMS Verdun was an Admiralty V-class destroyer of the Royal Navy which saw service in the First and Second World Wars. She has been the only ship of the Royal Navy to bear the name Verdun, after the Battle of Verdun. She was assigned to carry the remains of The Unknown Warrior home to Britain on 8 November 1920.

== First World War ==
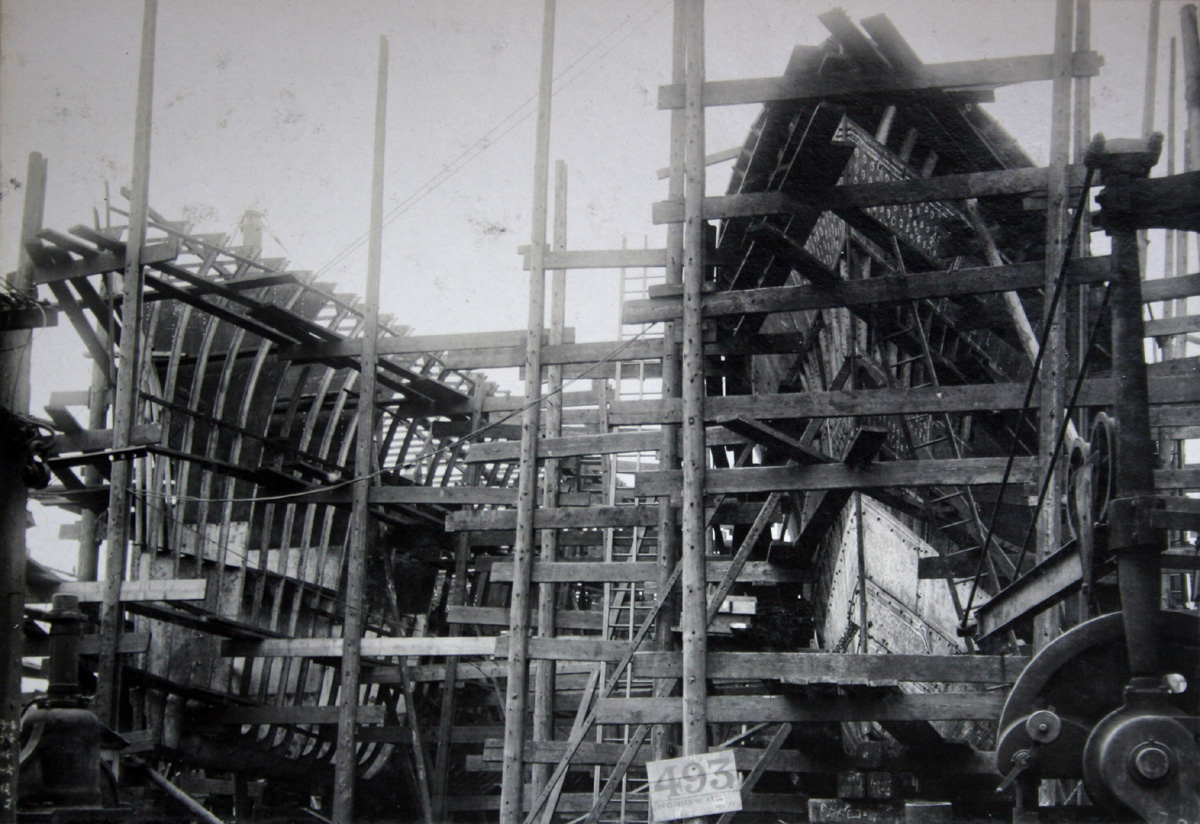
HMS Verdun under construction at the Hawthorn Leslie shipyard in Hebburn in 1917

Launched on 21 August 1917 at the Hawthorn Leslie shipyard in Hebburn on Tyneside, Verdun was completed in November of the same year. She served with the Grand Fleet and the Harwich Force.

== Surrender of the German High Seas Fleet ==
Under the terms of the Armistice, the German High Seas Fleet went into internment at the Royal Navy's base at Scapa Flow – in Operation ZZ, 60 Allied battleships escorted 11 battleships, 5 battlecruisers, 8 cruisers and 48 destroyers of the High Seas Fleet into captivity. At 11:00 on 20 November 1918 King George V, Queen Mary and the Prince of Wales embarked in HMS Oak and, preceded by Verdun, steamed through the fleet.

== The Unknown Warrior ==
Verdun was selected to carry the Unknown Warrior across the English Channel because her name would be a tribute to the French people and the endurance of their armies at Verdun in 1916. On 10 November 1920, Verdun berthed at the Quai Carnot at Boulogne-sur-Mer. The coffin of the Unknown Warrior arrived on a French military wagon in a procession of a thousand local schoolchildren and a whole division of French soldiers and marines. Marshal Foch made a speech on the dockside before the White Ensign was lowered to half mast while the coffin was carried up the gangplank and piped aboard with an admiral's salute. The coffin was laid on the quarterdeck and covered with wreaths of white flowers, some so large that it took four soldiers to lift one. Shortly before noon, Verdun moved away from the quay as sailors fired a rifle salute along with the big guns of the French forts. An escort of six destroyers (HMS Witherington, HMS Wanderer, HMS Whitshed, HMS Wivern, HMS Wolverine, and HMS Veteran) accompanied Verdun through the mist to Dover where a 19-gun salute was fired from Dover Castle. She tied up at Admiralty Pier where General Sir John Longley supervised the six high-ranking officers from the three Armed Services who bore the coffin ashore. From Dover Marine Station the Unknown Warrior was taken by train to London for burial the following day at Westminster Abbey.

== Second World War ==
Verdun received a Le Cheminant deck watch from the Royal Observatory on 13 August 1927. She went into reserve at Rosyth as part of the 9th Destroyer Flotilla until September 1939, when she was selected for conversion into an anti-aircraft escort (WAIR) at Chatham Dockyard. She was rearmed and her pennant number changed from D93 to L93 on completion in May 1940. She operated as a convoy escort out of Rosyth and in the North Sea, being damaged by a bomb on 1 November 1940 that killed 11 men, including her captain. She was repaired at Harwich and spent the rest of the war escorting convoys along the east coast. In November 1941, she was in sustained action against an attack by German E-boats; three British merchant ships were sunk in the engagement. From February to April 1942 she formed part of the escort screen for heavy units of the Home Fleet that were supporting the Arctic convoys. After the Warship Week National Savings campaign in March 1942, Verdun was adopted by the seaside town of Hoylake in Cheshire.

== Fate ==
Verdun was placed in reserve after VE Day and then sold to be scrapped at Granton, Edinburgh, in April 1946. Her ship's bell now hangs on a pillar in Westminster Abbey, close to the Tomb of the Unknown Warrior.

== Bibliography ==
- Campbell, John (1985). Naval Weapons of World War II. Annapolis, Maryland: Naval Institute Press. ISBN 0-87021-459-4.
- Chesneau, Roger, ed. (1980). Conway's All the World's Fighting Ships 1922–1946. Greenwich, UK: Conway Maritime Press. ISBN 0-85177-146-7.
- Colledge, J. J.; Warlow, Ben (2006) [1969]. Ships of the Royal Navy: The Complete Record of All Fighting Ships of the Royal Navy from the 15th Century to the Present (3rd Rev ed.). London: Chatham Publishing. ISBN 978-1-86176-281-8. OCLC 67375475.
- Cocker, Maurice. Destroyers of the Royal Navy, 1893–1981. Ian Allan. ISBN 0-7110-1075-7.
- Donald, William (1956). Stand by for Action: the Memoirs of a Small Ship Commander. London UK: William Kimber & Co. ltd. ISBN 978-1-84832-016-1.
- Friedman, Norman (2009). British Destroyers From Earliest Days to the Second World War. Annapolis, Maryland: Naval Institute Press. ISBN 978-1-59114-081-8.
- Gardiner, Robert & Gray, Randal, eds. (1985). Conway's All the World's Fighting Ships 1906–1921. Annapolis, Maryland: Naval Institute Press. ISBN 0-85177-245-5.
- Lenton, H. T. (1998). British & Empire Warships of the Second World War. Annapolis, Maryland: Naval Institute Press. ISBN 1-55750-048-7.
- March, Edgar J. (1966). British Destroyers: A History of Development, 1892–1953; Drawn by Admiralty Permission From Official Records & Returns, Ships' Covers & Building Plans. London: Seeley Service. OCLC 164893555.
- Preston, Antony (1971). 'V & W' Class Destroyers 1917–1945. London: Macdonald. OCLC 464542895.
- Raven, Alan & Roberts, John (1979). 'V' and 'W' Class Destroyers. Man o'War. Vol. 2. London: Arms & Armour. ISBN 0-85368-233-X.
- Rohwer, Jürgen (2005). Chronology of the War at Sea 1939–1945: The Naval History of World War Two (Third Revised ed.). Annapolis, Maryland: Naval Institute Press. ISBN 1-59114-119-2.
- Whinney, Bob (2000). The U-boat Peril: A Fight for Survival. Cassell. ISBN 0-304-35132-6.
- Whitley, M. J. (1988). Destroyers of World War 2. Annapolis, Maryland: Naval Institute Press. ISBN 0-87021-326-1.
- Winser, John de D. (1999). B.E.F. Ships Before, At and After Dunkirk. Gravesend, Kent: World Ship Society. ISBN 0-905617-91-6.
