= HMS Dido (1896) =

Eclipse-class cruiser

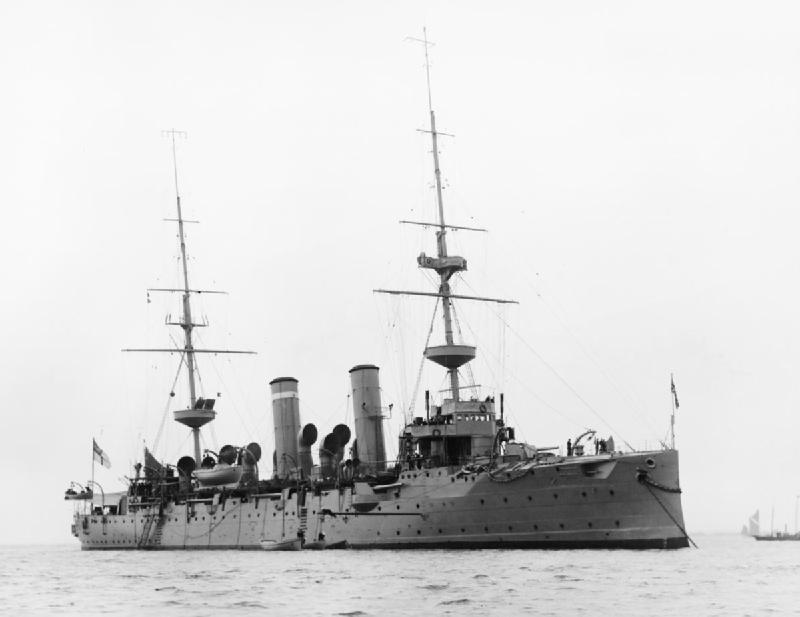
- Dido at anchor during World War I

History

United Kingdom
- Name: HMS Dido
- Namesake: Dido
- Builder: London & Glasgow Shipbuilding, Govan
- Laid down: 30 August 1894
- Launched: 20 March 1896
- Completed: 10 May 1898
- Reclassified: As depot ship, 1912
- Fate: Sold for scrap, 26 December 1926

General characteristics
- Class & type: Eclipse-class protected cruiser
- Displacement: 5,600 long tons (5,690 t)
- Length: 350 ft (106.7 m)
- Beam: 53 ft 6 in (16.3 m)
- Draught: 20 ft 6 in (6.25 m)
- Installed power: 9,600 ihp (7,200 kW); 8 cylindrical boilers
- Propulsion: 2 shafts, 2 Inverted triple-expansion steam engines
- Speed: 18.5 knots (34.3 km/h; 21.3 mph)
- Complement: 450
- Armament: As built: 5 × QF 6-inch (152 mm) guns; 6 × QF 4.7-inch (120 mm) guns; 6 × 3-pounder QF guns; 3 × 18-inch torpedo tubes; After 1905: 11 × six-inch QF guns; 9 × 76 mm (3.0 in) QF guns; 7 × 3-pounder QF guns; 3 × 18-inch torpedo tubes
- Armour: Gun shields: 3 in (76 mm); Engine hatch: 6 in (152 mm); Decks: 1.5–3 in (38–76 mm); Conning tower: 6 in (152 mm)

HMS Dido was an Eclipse-class protected cruiser built for the Royal Navy in the mid-1890s.

== Design ==
Eclipse-class second-class protected cruisers were preceded by the shorter Astraea-class cruisers. Dido had a displacement of 5,600 long tons (5,700 t; 6,300 short tons) when at normal load. It had a total length of 373 ft (114 m), a beam of 53 ft 6 in (16.31 m), a metacentric height of around 3 m (9 ft 10 in), and a draught of 20 ft 6 in (6.25 m). It was powered by two inverted triple-expansion steam engines which used steam from eight cylindrical boilers. Using normal draught, the boilers were intended to provide the engines with enough steam to generate 8,000 indicated horsepower (6,000 kW) and to reach a speed of 18.5 knots (34.3 km/h; 21.3 mph); using forced draft, the equivalent figures were 9,600 indicated horsepower (7,200 kW) and a speed of 19.5 knots (36.1 km/h; 22.4 mph). Eclipse-class cruisers carried a maximum of 1,075 long tons (1,092 t) of coal and achieved maximum speed of 20 knots (37 km/h; 23 mph) in sea trials.

It carried five 40-calibre 6-inch (152 mm) quick-firing (QF) guns in single mounts protected by gun shields. One gun was mounted on the forecastle, two on the quarterdeck and one pair was abreast the bridge. They fired 100-pound (45 kg) shells at a muzzle velocity of 2,205 ft/s (672 m/s). The secondary armament consisted of six 40-calibre 4.7-inch (120 mm) guns; three on each broadside. Their 45-pound (20.4 kg) shells were fired at a muzzle velocity of 2,125 ft/s (648 m/s). It was fitted with three 18-inch torpedo tubes, one submerged tube on each broadside and one above water in the stern. Its ammunition supply consisted of 200 six-inch rounds per gun, 250 shells for each 4.7-inch gun, 300 rounds per gun for the 76 mm (3.0 in)s and 500 for each three-pounder. Dido had ten torpedoes, presumably four for each broadside tube and two for the stern tube.

== Construction ==
Dido was laid down at London and Glasgow Shipbuilding Company's Govan, Glasgow shipyard on 30 August 1894. An initial attempt to launch the ship on 18 March 1896 proved unsuccessful, with the ship sticking on the slipway, but a second attempt on 20 March proved successful, with the ship being completed on 10 May 1898, at a cost of £252,278.

== Operational history ==
While serving in the Mediterranean she cruised Greek waters in March 1900. She was later posted to the China Station. In October 1901 she left Hong Kong homebound, arriving at Sheerness 14 December. She paid off at Chatham on 11 January 1902 and was placed in the Fleet Reserve as an emergency ship.

It was more than a year until she was commissioned again in February 1903 with the crew of HMS Galatea, succeeding her as coast guard ship at Humber district based at Hull.

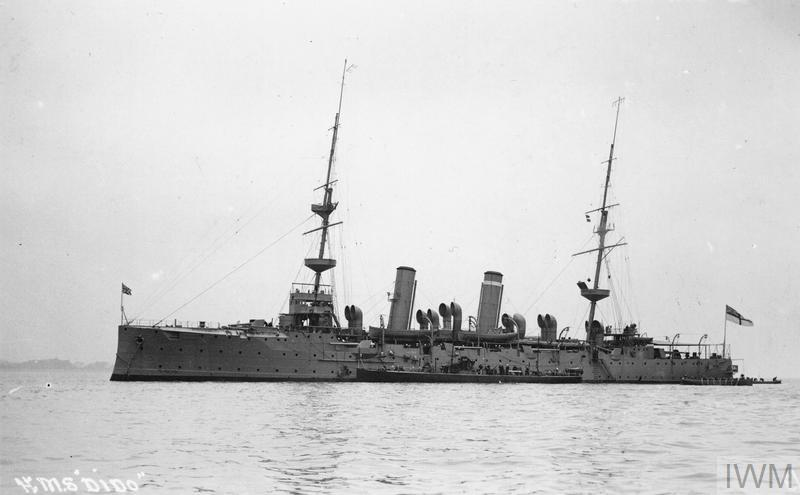
Cruiser HMS Dido used a depot ship at Spithead

She received a Le Cheminant chronometer from the Royal Observatory on 17 March 1916.
