= HMS Terpsichore =

Five ships of the Royal Navy have borne the name HMS Terpsichore, after Terpsichore, one of the Muses of Greek mythology:

- HMS Terpsichore (1760) was a 24-gun sixth rate captured from the French in 1760 and sold in 1766.
- HMS Terpsichore (1785) was a 32-gun fifth rate launched in 1785. She was used as a receiving ship from 1818 and was broken up in 1830.
- HMS Terpsichore (1847) was an 18-gun sloop launched in 1847. She was sunk in torpedo trials in 1865, and was raised and broken up in 1866.
- HMS Terpsichore (1890) was an Apollo-class protected cruiser launched in 1890 and sold in 1914.
- HMS Terpsichore (R33) was a T-class destroyer launched in 1943. She was converted into a Type 16 frigate between 1952 and 1955, and was broken up in 1966.

== See also ==
- French ship Terpsichore
