= HMS Despatch (D30) =

Cruiser of the Royal Navy

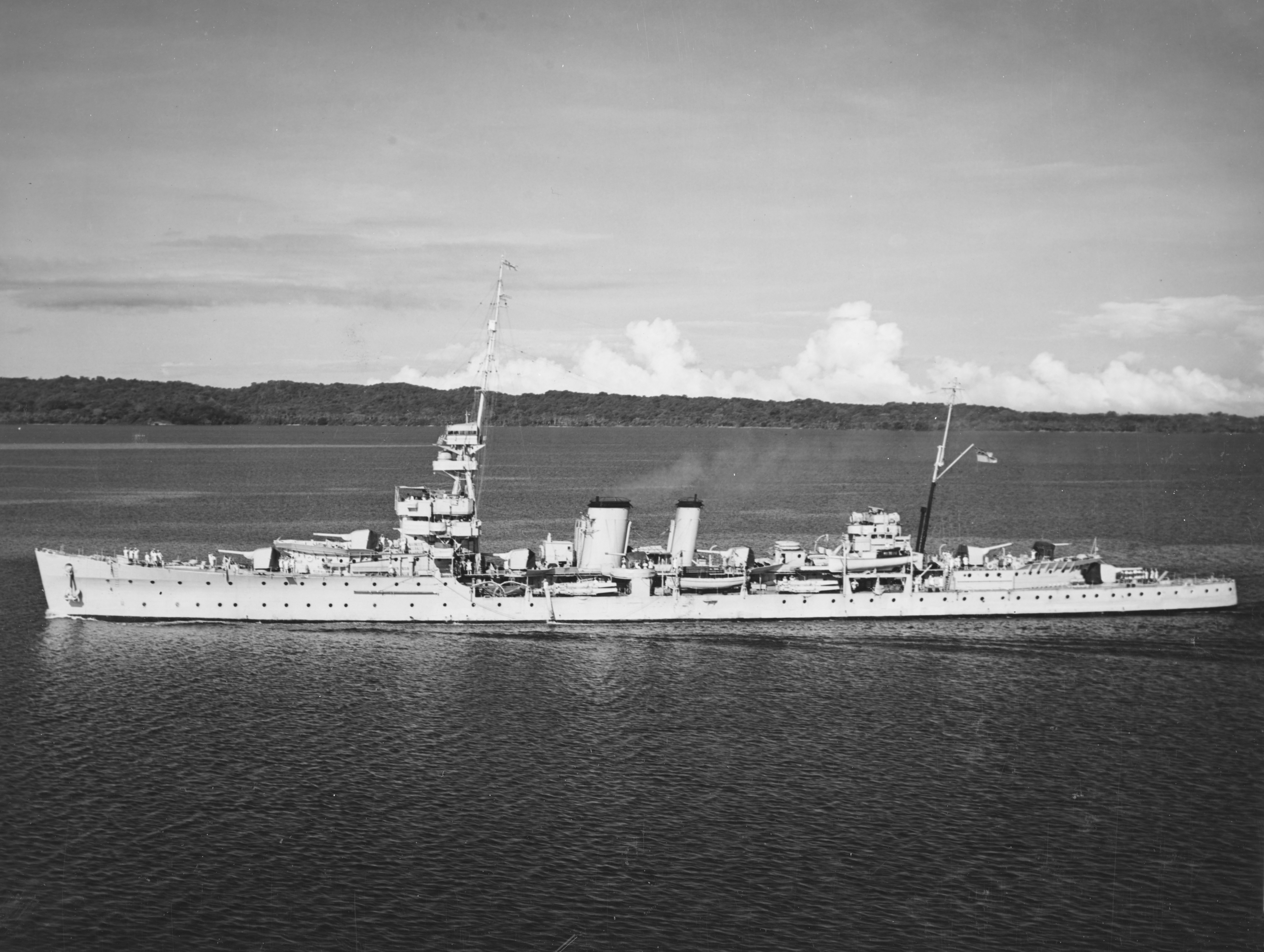
- HMS Despatch in October 1939

History

United Kingdom
- Name: HMS Despatch
- Ordered: March 1918
- Builder: Fairfield Shipbuilding and Engineering Company, Govan
- Laid down: 8 July 1918
- Launched: 24 September 1919
- Commissioned: 2 June 1922
- Identification: Pennant number: 10 (Jan 22); 30 (19??); I.30 (1936); D.30 (1940)
- Fate: Sold for scrap, 5 April 1946

General characteristics (as built)
- Class & type: Danae-class light cruiser
- Displacement: 4,970 long tons (5,050 t)
- Length: 445 ft (135.6 m) p/p; 472 ft 6 in (144.0 m) o/a
- Beam: 46 ft 9 in (14.2 m)
- Draught: 16 ft 11 in (5.16 m) (mean, deep load)
- Installed power: 40,000 shp (30,000 kW); 6 × Yarrow boilers
- Propulsion: 2 × shafts; 2 × geared steam turbines
- Speed: 29 kn (54 km/h; 33 mph)
- Complement: 460
- Armament: 6 × single BL 6 in (152 mm) Mk XII guns; 2 × single QF 4 in (102 mm) Mk V anti-aircraft guns; 2 × single QF 2-pounder AA guns; 4 × triple 21 in (533 mm) torpedo tubes
- Armour: Waterline belt: 1.25–3 in (32–76 mm); Deck: 1 in (25 mm)
- Notes: Received a Le Cheminant deck watch from the Royal Observatory on 23 January 1933.

HMS Despatch was a Danae-class light cruiser built for the Royal Navy during World War I. She was part of the Delhi sub-class of the Danae class.

== Design and description ==
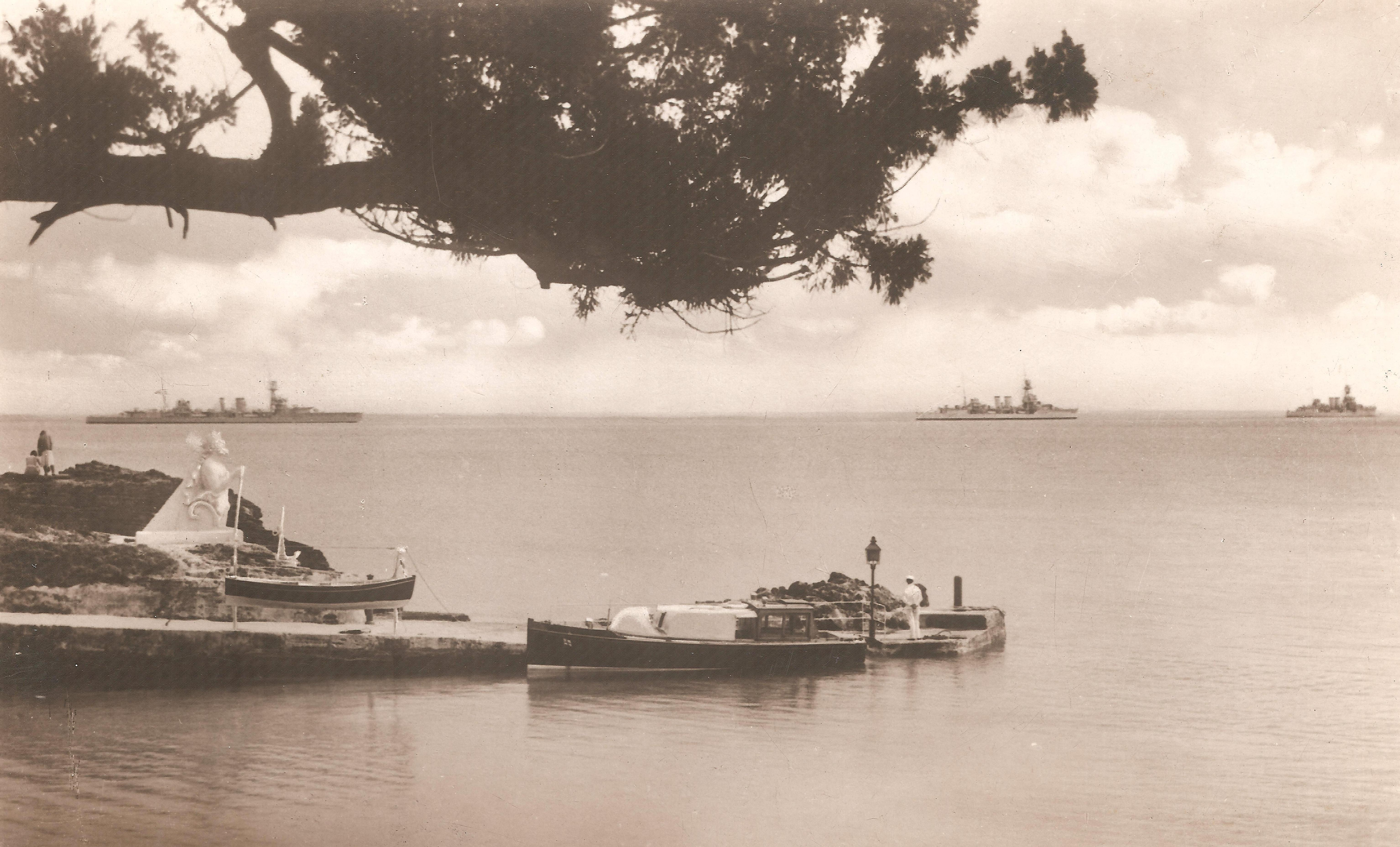
America and West Indies Station 1st Division (HMS Dragon, HMS Danae and HMS Despatch) off Admiralty House in 1931 as they depart their base at the Royal Naval Dockyard in the Imperial fortress colony of Bermuda to exercise on the open ocean

The Delhi sub-class was identical with the preceding ships except that their bows were raised for better seakeeping. The ships were 472 feet 6 inches (144.0 m) long overall, with a beam of 46 feet 9 inches (14.2 m) and a mean deep draught of 16 feet 11 inches (5.2 m). Displacement was 4,970 long tons (5,050 t) at normal and 5,250 long tons (5,330 t) at deep load. Despatch was powered by two Brown-Curtis steam turbines, each driving one propeller shaft, which produced a total of 40,000 indicated horsepower (30,000 kW). The turbines used steam generated by six Yarrow boilers which gave her a speed of about 29 knots (54 km/h; 33 mph). She carried 1,050 long tons (1,067 t) tons of fuel oil. The ship had a crew of about 450 officers and other ranks.

Despatch was armed with six centreline BL 6-inch (152 mm) Mk XII guns. One superfiring pair of guns was forward of the bridge, another pair were fore and aft of the two funnels and the last two were in the stern, with one gun superfiring over the rearmost gun. The two QF 4 inch Mk V naval gun anti-aircraft guns were positioned on elevated platforms between the funnels and the QF 2-pounder "pom-pom" AA guns were amidships on the upper deck. The ships were equipped with a dozen 21 in (533 mm) torpedo tubes in four triple mounts, two on each broadside.

== Construction and career ==
She was laid down by Fairfield Shipbuilding and Engineering Company on 8 July 1918, launched on 24 September 1919, towed to Chatham Dockyard, and completed there on 15 June 1922.

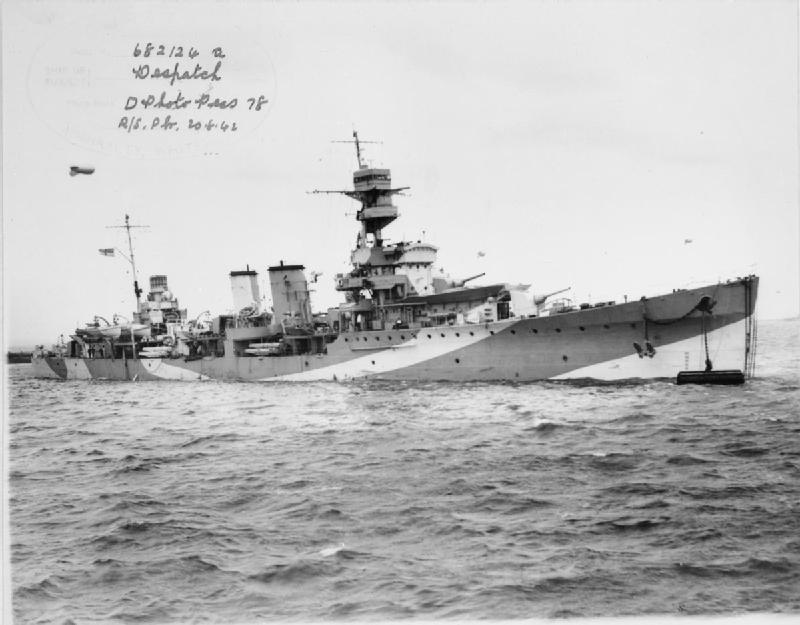
HMS Despatch in July 1942.

Despatch had a relatively quiet wartime career, compared to her sisters. She was operating in the South Atlantic for the early part of the war, where she captured the German freighter SS Düsseldorf and intercepted the German merchant ship Troja. The crew of Troja scuttled her, however, before the ship could be captured. She was in the Mediterranean, escorting convoys in late 1940, and became involved in Operation White and the Battle of Cape Spartivento. By the battle of Cape Spartivento as part of Force "B", a sub-unit of Force "H", Gibraltar.

18.2.43. - At 13.45hrs HMS Despatch intercepted Spanish ship Monte Naranco in position 14-42N, 23-01W and placed an armed guard aboard and ordered the Greek destroyer HHelMS Adrias to escort her for one day towards Gibraltar.

Despatch was present at the Normandy landings in June 1944. She was the headquarters ship for the Mulberry harbours. Whilst at Mulberry 'B' Despatch was present for the visit of H.M. King George VI. For her HQ Ship role, Despatch had had all her original guns removed and replaced with 16 Bofors 40 mm Anti-Aircraft guns manned by army gunners from 127th (Queen's) Light Anti-Aircraft Regiment, Royal Artillery, to support her role as "Traffic Control" in building the Mulberry Harbour at Arromanches. Her captain, Commander R.T. White DSO**, was allocated landing pass "number one" for Arromanches.

Despatch was reduced to reserve in January 1945, and sold on 5 April 1946 for scrapping. She arrived at the yards of Arnott Young, of Troon, Scotland on 5 May 1946 to be broken up.

== Bibliography ==
- Campbell, N.J.M. (1980). "Great Britain". In Chesneau, Roger (ed.). Conway's All the World's Fighting Ships 1922–1946. Mayflower Books. pp. 2–85. ISBN 0-8317-0303-2.
- Colledge, J. J.; Warlow, Ben (2006) [1969]. Ships of the Royal Navy: The Complete Record of All Fighting Ships of the Royal Navy from the 15th Century to the Present (3rd Rev ed.). London: Chatham Publishing. ISBN 978-1-86176-281-8. OCLC 67375475.
- Fechter, Helmut; Hümmelchen, Gerhard (1972). Seekriegsatlas : Mittelmeer, Schwarzes Meer : 1940–1943. J. F. Lehmanns Verlag. ISBN 9783469002983.
- Friedman, Norman (2010). British Cruisers: Two World Wars and After. Seaforth. ISBN 978-1-59114-078-8.
- Newbolt, Henry (1996) [1931]. Naval Operations. History of the Great War Based on Official Documents. Vol. V. Battery Press. ISBN 0-89839-255-1.
- Preston, Antony (1985). "Great Britain and Empire Forces". In Gray, Randal (ed.). Conway's All the World's Fighting Ships 1906–1921. Naval Institute Press. pp. 1–104. ISBN 0-85177-245-5.
- Raven, Alan & Roberts, John (1980). British Cruisers of World War Two. Naval Institute Press. ISBN 0-87021-922-7.
- Routledge, Brigadier N.W. (1994) History of the Royal Regiment of Artillery: Anti-Aircraft Artillery 1914–55, Royal Artillery Institution/Brassey's, ISBN 1-85753-099-3.
- Rohwer, Jürgen (2005). Chronology of the War at Sea 1939–1945: The Naval History of World War Two (Third Revised ed.). Naval Institute Press. ISBN 1-59114-119-2.
- Whitley, M. J. (1995). Cruisers of World War Two: An International Encyclopedia. Cassell. ISBN 1-86019-874-0.
