= SS Beaverburn =

Beaverburn was the name of two steamships operated by the Canadian Pacific Railway:

- SS Beaverburn (1927), torpedoed and sunk in 1940
- SS Beaverburn (1944), sold to Ben Line in 1960
