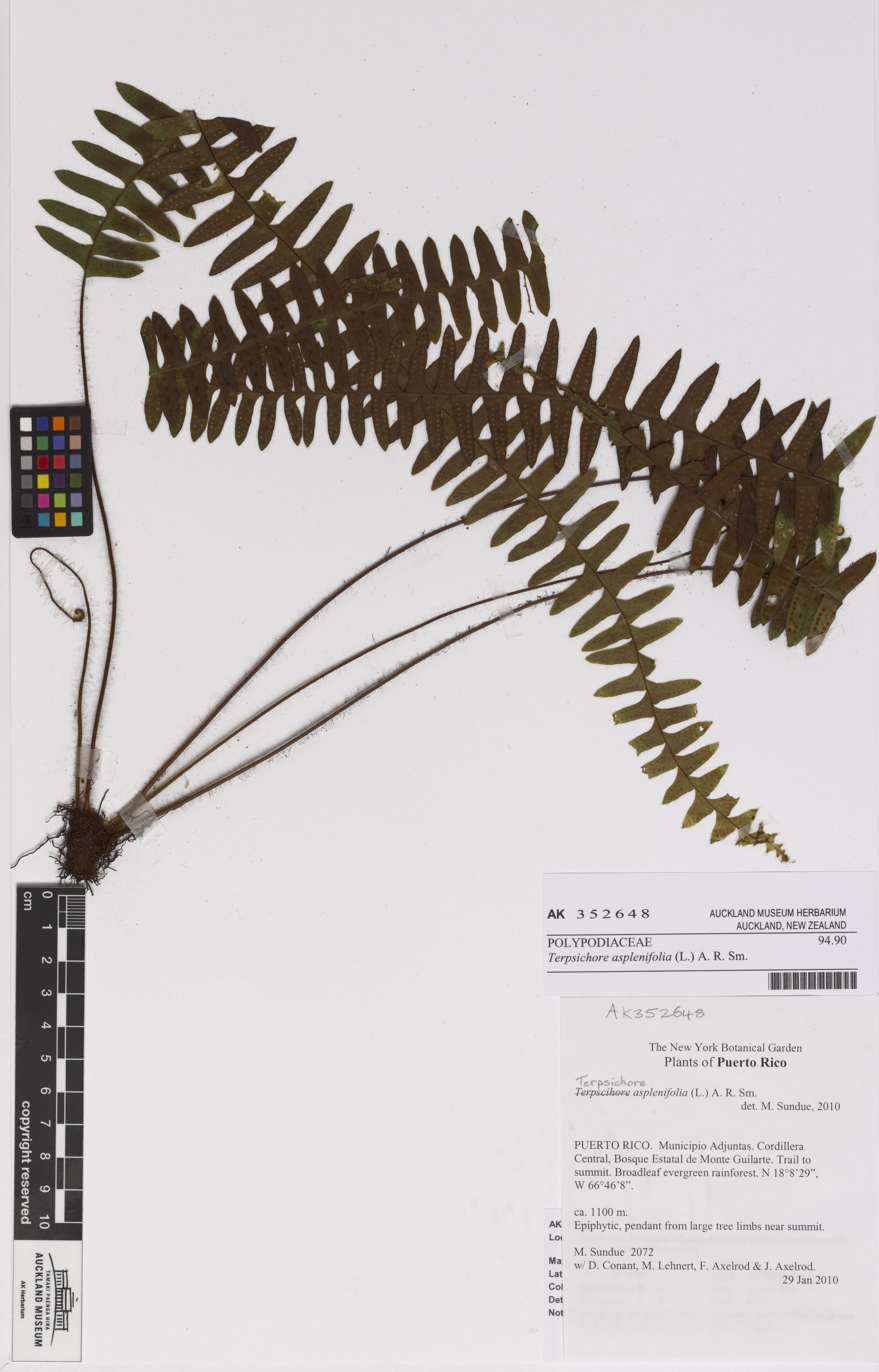
- Terpsichore asplenifolia

Scientific classification
- Kingdom: Plantae
- Clade: Tracheophytes
- Division: Polypodiophyta
- Class: Polypodiopsida
- Order: Polypodiales
- Suborder: Polypodiineae
- Family: Polypodiaceae
- Subfamily: Grammitidoideae
- Genus: Terpsichore; A.R.Sm.

Species
- See text

= Terpsichore (plant) =

Genus of ferns

Terpsichore is a genus of ferns in the family Polypodiaceae, subfamily Grammitidoideae, according to the Pteridophyte Phylogeny Group classification of 2016 (PPG I).

It is native to the Neotropical realm in the Americas.

== Description ==
The genus consists of small ferns with arching fronds of determinate size. Rhizomes are radially symmetric or slightly flattened, with orange to brown scales which often bear setulae (small bristles) on the edges and sometimes the surface. Except for Terpsichore atroviridis, sporangia bear setae (bristles). The stipe (leaf stalk) is distinct from the blade, and the blade does not taper gradually to its attachment to the rhizome. Setae on the leaf tissue are borne singly, rather than in clusters, and hydathodes (enlarged vein endings) do not secrete a chalk precipitate. Unlike Ascogrammitis and Mycopteris, black fungal fruiting bodies are not found on the leaf blades.

== Taxonomy ==
Terpsichore was first described by Alan R. Smith in 1993, one of several genera to be recognized to remove many Neotropical grammitids from the genus Grammitis. The name, originally applied to some members of the group by L. Earl Bishop, but not published by him, honors Terpsichore, the muse of dance. Subsequent phylogenetic analyses showed that Terpsichore, as originally described, was polyphyletic. Five new genera, Alansmia, Galactodenia, Moranopteris, Ascogrammitis, and Mycopteris were recognized in order to accommodate most of the species in the genus; the species from only one of Smith's five informal infrageneric groups, the Terpsichore asplenifolia group, remain in Terpsichore as presently circumscribed.

== Species ==
As of October 2025, the Checklist of Ferns and Lycophytes of the World accepted the following sixteen species:

- Terpsichore alfaroi (Donn. Sm.) A.R.Sm.
- Terpsichore alsophilicola (Christ) A.R.Sm.
- Terpsichore asplenifolia (L.) A.R.Sm.
- Terpsichore atroviridis (Copel.) A.R.Sm.
- Terpsichore bipinnata (Stolze) A.R.Sm.
- Terpsichore chrysleri (Copel.) A.R.Sm.
- Terpsichore dolorensis (Hieron.) A.R.Sm.
- Terpsichore eggersii (Baker ex Hook.) A.R.Sm.
- Terpsichore exornans (Maxon) A.R.Sm.
- Terpsichore flexuosa (Maxon) A.R.Sm.
- Terpsichore haenkeana (Proctor) A.R.Sm.
- Terpsichore jenmanii (Underw. ex Maxon) A.R.Sm.
- Terpsichore lehmanniana (Hieron.) A.R.Sm.
- Terpsichore liogieri (Proctor) A.R.Sm.
- Terpsichore paulistana (Brade & Rosenst.) A.R.Sm.
- Terpsichore staheliana (Posth.) A.R.Sm.

== Bibliography ==
- Smith, Alan R. (1993). "Terpsichore, a New Genus of Grammitidaceae (Pteridophyta)". Novon. 3 (4): 478–489. doi:10.2307/3391398. JSTOR 3391398.
- Sundue, Michael A. (2010). "A Morphological Cladistic Analysis of Terpsichore (Polypodiaceae)". Systematic Botany. 35 (4): 716–729. doi:10.1600/036364410X539808. S2CID 86594320.
- Sundue, Michael A. (2014). "Mycopteris, a new neotropical genus of grammitid ferns (Polypodiaceae)". Brittonia. 66 (2): 174–185. doi:10.1007/s12228-013-9322-0. S2CID 41060242.
