= HMS Terpsichore (R33) =

T-class destroyer converted to Type 16 frigate of the Royal Navy

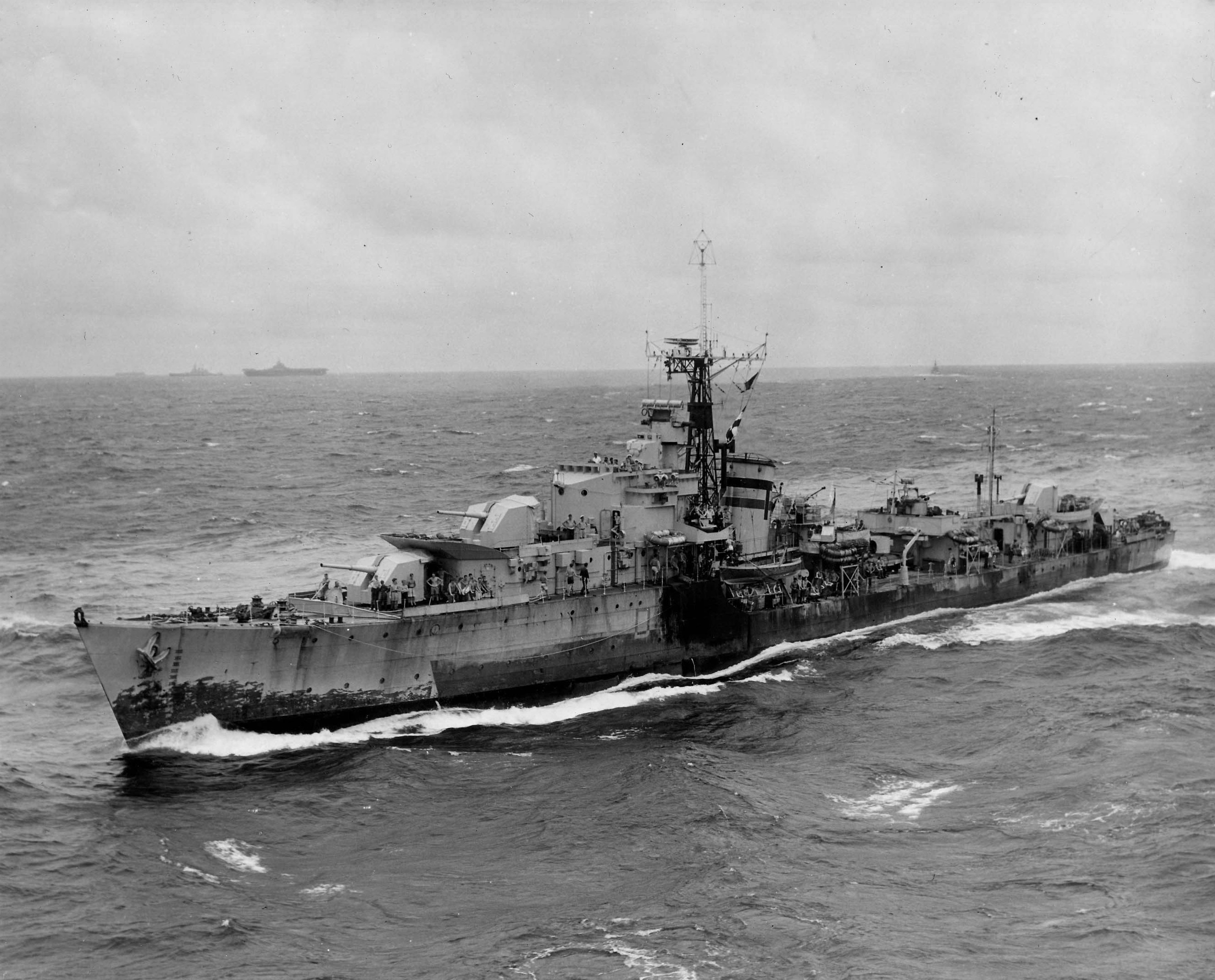

History

United Kingdom
- Name: HMS Terpischore
- Ordered: 13 March 1941
- Builder: William Denny & Brothers, Dumbarton, Scotland
- Laid down: 25 November 1941
- Launched: 17 June 1943
- Commissioned: 20 January 1944
- Recommissioned: 1954
- Decommissioned: 1946
- Out of service: 1960
- Identification: Pennant number: R33, D48 (1945), F19 (NATO)
- Fate: Scrapped at Troon in May 1966

General characteristics as T–class
- Class & type: T-class destroyer
- Displacement: 1,710 long tons (1,737 t) - 1,730 long tons (1,758 t) (standard nominal); 1,780 long tons (1,809 t) - 1,810 long tons (1,839 t) (actual); 2,505 long tons (2,545 t) - 2,545 long tons (2,586 t) (deep load)
- Length: 339 ft 6 in (103.48 m) pp; 362 ft 9 in (110.57 m) oa
- Beam: 35 ft 8 in (10.87 m)
- Draught: 14 ft 2 in (4.32 m)
- Propulsion: 2 shaft Parsons geared turbines; 2 Admiralty 3-drum boilers; 40,000 shp (30,000 kW)
- Speed: 36.75 knots (42.29 mph; 68.06 km/h)
- Complement: 180-225
- Armament: 4 × 4.7-inch (120-mm) QF Mk IX guns (4×1); 2 × 40mm Bofors (1x2); 8 × 20 mm guns anti-aircraft guns; 8 × 21-inch (533 mm) torpedo tubes (2×4)

General characteristics as Type 16
- Class & type: Type 16 frigate
- Displacement: 1,800 long tons (1,800 t) standard; 2,300 long tons (2,300 t) full load
- Length: 362 ft 9 in (110.57 m) o/a
- Beam: 37 ft 9 in (11.51 m)
- Draught: 14 ft 6 in (4.42 m)
- Propulsion: 2 × Admiralty 3-drum boilers; Steam turbines, 40,000 shp; 2 shafts
- Speed: 32 knots (37 mph; 59 km/h) full load
- Complement: 175
- Sensors & processing systems: Type 293Q target indication Radar; Type 974 navigation Radar; Type 1010 Cossor Mark 10 IFF; Type 146B search Sonar; Type 147 depth finder Sonar; Type 162 target classification Sonar; Type 174 attack Sonar
- Armament: 1 × twin 4 in gun Mark 19; 1 × twin 40 mm Bofors gun Mk.5; 5 × single 40 mm Bofors gun Mk.9; 2 × Squid A/S mortar; 1 × quad 21 in (533 mm) tubes for Mk.9 torpedoes

HMS Terpsichore was a T-class destroyer built for the Royal Navy during the Second World War.

== Description ==
Terpsichore, named after Terpsichore of Greek mythology, displaced 1,710 long tons (1,740 t) at standard load and 2,530 long tons (2,570 t) at deep load. She had an overall length of 362 feet 9 inches (110.6 m), a beam of 35 feet 8 inches (10.9 m) and a deep draught of 14 feet 6 inches (4.4 m). She was powered by two Parsons geared steam turbines, each driving one propeller shaft, using steam provided by two Admiralty three-drum boilers. The turbines developed a total of 40,000 shaft horsepower (30,000 kW) and gave a maximum speed of 36 knots (67 km/h; 41 mph). Terpsichore carried a maximum of 615 long tons (625 t) of fuel oil that gave her a range of 4,675 nautical miles (8,658 km; 5,380 mi) at 20 knots (37 km/h; 23 mph). Her complement was 170 officers and ratings.

The ship was armed with four 45-calibre 4.7-inch (120 mm) Mark XII guns in dual-purpose mounts. For anti-aircraft (AA) defence, Terpsichore had one twin mount for Bofors 40 mm guns and four twin 20-millimetre (0.8 in) Oerlikon autocannon. She was fitted with two above-water quadruple mounts for 21-inch (533 mm) torpedoes. Two depth charge rails and four throwers were fitted for which 70 depth charges were provided.

== Construction and career ==
In August 1945 Terpsichore was sent to Japan, under the command of Commander R. T. White D.S.O.** (later Captain R. T. White D.S.O.**, 2nd son of Sir Archibald White, Bt., of Wallingwells), as the lead destroyer in the escort group of the USS Mississippi into Tokyo Bay. Commander White witnessed the surrender of the Japanese Forces and received a surrendered Samurai sword from the Japanese.

Between 1946 and 1953 Terpsichore was held in reserve at Devonport. Between 1953 and 1954 she was converted to a Type 16 fast anti-submarine frigate, by Thornycroft, Woolston, with the new pennant number F19. In 1955 she was placed in reserve in Devonport, undergoing a refit there in December 1957. Between 1960 and 1966 Terpsichore was held in reserve at Lisahally. She was subsequently sold for scrap and arrived at Troon on 17 May 1966.

== Bibliography ==
- Chesneau, Roger, ed. (1980). Conway's All the World's Fighting Ships 1922–1946. Greenwich, UK: Conway Maritime Press. ISBN 0-85177-146-7.
- Colledge, J. J.; Warlow, Ben (2006) [1969]. Ships of the Royal Navy: The Complete Record of All Fighting Ships of the Royal Navy from the 15th Century to the Present (3rd Rev ed.). London: Chatham Publishing. ISBN 978-1-86176-281-8. OCLC 67375475.
- Critchley, Mike (1982). British Warships Since 1945: Part 3: Destroyers. Liskeard, UK: Maritime Books. ISBN 0-9506323-9-2.
- English, John (2001). Obdurate to Daring: British Fleet Destroyers 1941–45. Windsor, UK: World Ship Society. ISBN 978-0-9560769-0-8.
- Lenton, H. T. (1998). British & Empire Warships of the Second World War. Annapolis, Maryland: Naval Institute Press. ISBN 1-55750-048-7.
- Raven, Alan; Roberts, John (1978). War Built Destroyers O to Z Classes. London: Bivouac Books. ISBN 0-85680-010-4.
- Whitley, M. J. (1988). Destroyers of World War 2. Annapolis, Maryland: Naval Institute Press. ISBN 0-87021-326-1.
